= Rafa al-Nasiri =

- Born: 1940; Tikrit, Iraq
- Died: 7 December 2013 (aged 72–73); Amman, Jordan
- Education: Diploma in Painting, Institute of Fine Arts, Baghdad (1956-1959); B.A. in Printmaking, Central Academy of Fine Arts, Beijing (1959-1963); Diploma in Printmaking, The Gravura, Lisbon (1969); International Summer Academy, Salzburg, Austria (1974-75)
- Known for: Painter, draughtsman, print-maker, educator and author
- Spouse(s): May Muzaffar (poet and artist) m. 1973
- Website: Rafa Nasiri

Rafa al-Nasiri (b.1940 Tikrit, Iraq -7 December 2013 Amman, Jordan) was an Iraqi painter, draughtsman, print-maker, educator and author whose works with a social and political message resonated with the Iraqi public in the mid-20th century. He was also very influential in encouraging young artists to take up print-making.

== Life and career ==
Born in Tikrit, Iraq, Rafa al-Nasiri received his early art education at Baghdad’s Institute of Fine Arts, attaining a Diploma in Painting in 1959. He then pursued his training in print-making by attending Beijing’s Central Academy of Fine Arts in China (1959-1963). The artist described how he became attached to Chinese art:

"When the Chinese came to Baghdad in 1959 loaded with works of ivory, copper, silk, ceramics, and printmaking, I was still a student in the last year of my studies at the Institute of Fine Arts. The most wonderful Chinese antiques and masterpieces were organised and displayed in the main hall of the Institute so we, the students, could see them dozens of times every day. What attracted our attention and made us marvel most was a beautiful masterpiece comprised of fourteen ivory balls of varying sizes, all contained inside one ball, revolving smoothly around their pivot. Personally, however, I was drawn to the collection of watercolours and Chinese ink prints. Most of these were by the internationally renowned artist Qi Baishi (1864-1954) [sic], whose work I closely followed in his hometown of Beijing. Since that time, I became quite attached to traditional Chinese painting and realised that it differs in many aspects from European art.

While studying in China, under the guidance of Huang Yu Yi (b. 1927), al-Nasiri developed a passion for calligraphy and began to devise ways to include Arabic letters in his paintings and prints. In this way, al-Nasiri became a very early practitioner of an art form that became known as hurufiyya.

In 1965, after returning to Baghdad from China, he and two of his brothers went on a road trip, travelling through twenty-four Arab and European countries. During this time, he came into contact with Western art. Visiting prestigious museums such as the Museo del Prado, Louvre, British Museum, Rome’s Museum of Contemporary Art and Rijksmuseum in Amsterdam, he was introduced to the works of Velazquez, Goya and El Greco, Rubens, Rembrandt, Turner amongst others and was deeply impressed by the Impressionists.

Later, in 1967, he received a Gulbenkian Foundation scholarship to study print-making at the Gravura in Lisbon, Portugal. There he was exposed to a variety of techniques used by contemporary European artists and was especially influenced by the work of the French artist, Georges Mathieu (b. 1921) who used calligraphy in his artwork. This consolidated his interest in the use of Arabic letters in his own artwork.

Along with other eminent Iraqi artists, including Dia al-Azzawi, Shakir Hassan Al Said, Ismail Fattah, and Kadhim Hayder, Al-Nasiri was a major proponent of the pan-Arab modern art movement that gained momentum during the 1970s. At that time, Baghdad was the centre of contemporary art and culture in the Arab world, and spawned many organised art groups, many of which had deep philosophical underpinnings enshrined in published manifestoes. Al-Nasiri became actively involved in a number of these groups. He was a founding member of Baghdad's New Vision Group, formed during the 1960s; an art collective that formed after the July Revolution of 1958, to encourage artists to exercise greater freedom and experimentation by searching for inspiration in a variety of sources, but within a framework of heritage. He was also a founding member of the influential One Dimension Group founded in 1971 by Shakir Hassan Al Said.

He taught at the Institute of Fine Arts in Baghdad (from 1964), Yarmouk University in Jordan (1974-1989), and the University of Bahrain (1997-2003), and played an instrumental role in founding the print-making studio at Jordan’s Darat al Funun during the early 1990s where he set up the studio, ran courses and also organised exhibitions and was its inaugural Director. He held that post from 1993-1995.

He also authored several articles and books on the subject of graphic engraving and print-making. Through his teaching, active involvement in art groups, and his writing, al-Nasiri "influenced the subsequent generations and played an instrumental role in the development of a strong tradition of Iraqi print-making."

In the 1990s, he settled in Jordan and died in Amman on 7 December 2013. He was survived by his widow, the poet and artist May Muzaffar.

== Work ==
In addition to his paintings and prints, Al Nasiri was interested in book art and produced a number of limited edition works, some of which detailed his experiences living in war-torn Baghdad (e.g., Al Mutanabi Street). He also expressed his admiration for Iraq's 13th-century poets by producing art books featuring Arabic calligraphy and with compilations of verse by renowned classical and contemporary Arab poets such as al-Mutannabi and Mahmoud Darwish. He also authored several books and a number of journal articles on the history of graphic art.

His work is held in the permanent collections of several prestigious art museums in the Middle East, Asia and Europe, including: the Museum of Modern Art, Baghdad; Museum of Modern Art, Damascus; Jordan National Museum of Fine Arts, Amman; Darat Al Funun, Khalid Shoman Foundation, Amman; Mathaf Museum of Arab Art, Qatar; Barjeel Foundation, Al Sharja, UAE; Institute Du Monde Arabe, Paris; Modern Art Museum, Madrid; Museum of Contemporary Graphic Art, Norway; Collection of the International Academy, Salzburg; Collection of the Central Academy of Fine Arts, Beijing; Gravura, Lisbon, (Gulbenkian Foundation); The British Museum, London and the Victoria and Albert Museum, London.

Select list of paintings and prints

- Al Ahwar Girl, [The Girl from the Marshes], 1965
- From That Distant Land, collection of poetry by Mayy Muzaffar (limited edition art book)
- Seven Days in Baghdad art book, mixed media on paper, 2007
- Al Mutanabi Street mixed media on hinged wood, 2007

Select list of exhibitions

- Strokes of Genius: Contemporary Iraqi Art touring exhibition, opened in London, 2000
- Dafatir: Contemporary Iraqi Book Art, touring exhibition, opened University of North Texas, USA, 2005
- Word into Art: Artists of the Modern Middle East, 18 May- 26 September 2006, curated by the British Museum, London; travelling exhibition also at the Dubai Financial Centre, 7 February – 30 April 2008

Select list of publications

His key writings include:

- Contemporary Graphic Art, (in Arabic), Beirut, Arab Institute for Research and Publishing, 1997
- Horizons and Mirrors: Essays on Plastic Art, (in Arabic), Beirut, Arab Institute for Research and Publishing, 2005 ISBN 9953-36-798-1
- My Journey to China, Beirut, Arab Institute for Research and Publishing, 2012, ISBN 978 6144 191071
- "Arab Graphics," Ur, vol. 1, 1983, pp 12–17
- "Contemporary Iraqi Poster," Gilgamesh: A Journal of Modern Art, vol. 3, 1982, pp 6–12
- "Modern Iraqi Graphic Art," Gilgamesh: A Journal of Modern Art, vol. 1, 1987, pp 13–17
- "Survival through Art and the Art of Survival," International Journal of Contemporary Iraqi Studies, vol. 3, no. 3, 2009, pp 259–175

=== Prizes and awards ===
Al Nasiri was awarded a number of prestigious art prizes:

- The Honors Prize at the 4th International Graphics Biennale, Fredrickstad (Norway) 1978
- The Jury Prize at the International Painting Exhibition, Cagnes-sur-mer (France) 1977
- The Honors Prize at the International Summer Academy, Salzburg (Austria) 1974
- First Prize at the Baghdad International Festival of Art, Baghdad (Iraq) 1986

== See also ==
- Hurufiyya movement
- Iraqi art
- Islamic art
- Islamic calligraphy
- List of Iraqi artists
