= Jabra Ibrahim Jabra =

Iraqi-Palestinian writer and translator (1920–1994)

- جبرا ابراهيم جبرا
- Born: Jabra Ibrahim Gawriye Masoud Yahrin; 28 August 1919; Adana
- Died: 12 December 1994 (aged 75); Baghdad, Iraq
- Resting place: Baghdad
- Education: Government Arab College, Fitzwilliam House, Cambridge, Harvard University
- Known for: Fiction, poetry, criticism, painting
- Notable work: In Search of Walid Masoud, The First Well, Princesses' Street, Cry in a Long Night, Hunters in a Narrow Street, The Ship
- Style: Modernist realism, absurdism, Arab existentialism, stream of consciousness
- Movement: Shi'r, Hiwar, One Dimension Group, The Baghdad Modern Art Group; Hurufiyya movement
- Spouse: Lami'a Barqi al-'Askari
- Partner(s): Yusuf al-Khal, Suhayl Idriss, Badr Shakir al-Sayyab, Albert Adib, Tawfiq Sayigh
- Awards: 1988–1989 Sultan Bin Ali Al Owais Cultural Award

Jabra Ibrahim Jabra (28 August 1919 – 12 December 1994) (Arabic: جبرا ابراهيم جبرا) was an Iraqi-Palestinian author, artist and intellectual born in Adana in French-occupied Cilicia to a Syriac Orthodox Christian family. His family survived the Seyfo Genocide and fled to the British Mandate of Palestine in the early 1920s. Jabra was educated at government schools under the British-mandatory educational system in Bethlehem and Jerusalem, such as the Government Arab College, and won a scholarship from the British Council to study at the University of Cambridge. Following the events of 1948, Jabra fled Jerusalem and settled in Baghdad, where he found work teaching at the University of Baghdad. In 1952 he was awarded a Rockefeller Foundation Humanities fellowship to study English literature at Harvard University. Over the course of his literary career, Jabra wrote novels, short stories, poetry, criticism, and a screenplay. He was a prolific translator of modern English and French literature into Arabic. Jabra was also an enthusiastic painter, and he pioneered the Hurufiyya movement, which sought to integrate traditional Islamic art within contemporary art through the decorative use of Arabic script.

== Life and career ==
Jabra Ibrahim Jabra was born in 1919 in Adana, which was then part of the French Mandate of Syria, to Ibrahim Yahrin and his wife Maryam. His mother's first husband Dawood and twin brother Yusuf had been killed in the 1909 Adana massacre. After Maryam remarried, her husband Ibrahim was drafted into the Ottoman Army during World War I. The couple gave birth to their first son, Yusuf Ibrahim Jabra, in 1915. The family survived the Assyrian genocide, fled Adana, and emigrated to Bethlehem in the early 1920s.

In Bethlehem, Jabra attended the National School. After his family moved to Jerusalem in 1932, he enrolled at the Rashidiya School and graduated in 1937 from the Government Arab College. Jabra won a scholarship to study English at the University College of the South West in Exeter for the academic year 1939–1940, and stayed on in England to continue his studies at the University of Cambridge, because of the dangers of returning to Palestine by boat during World War II. At Cambridge, Jabra read English and earned a BA in 1943 from Fitzwilliam College, Cambridge, where his censor was William Sutherland Thatcher.

In 1943, Jabra returned to Jerusalem, where he began teaching English at the Rashidiyya College as a stipulation of his British Council scholarship. He also wrote a number of articles for local Arabic-language newspapers in Jerusalem.

In January 1948, Jabra and his family fled their home in Katamon in western Jerusalem shortly after the Semiramis Hotel bombing and moved to Baghdad. Jabra traveled to Amman, Beirut, and Damascus in search of work. In Damascus, Jabra went to the Iraqi embassy, where the cultural attaché, 'Abd al-'Aziz al-Douri, who would later become an eminent Iraqi historian, gave him a visa to teach at the Teachers' Training College for one year. In 1948, Jabra received an MA from Fitzwilliam College at the University of Cambridge. The MA did not require any coursework or residence in England as per the "Cambridge MA" system, whereby holders of a BA may obtain an MA after five years and the payment of a fee.

In 1952, Jabra married Lami'a Barqi al-Askari. The same year, he received a fellowship from the Rockefeller Foundation, arranged personally by John Marshall, to study English literature and literary criticism at Harvard University. While at Harvard between the fall of 1952 and January 1954, Jabra studied under Archibald MacLeish. While there, he translated his first novel, Cry in a Long Night, from English into Arabic and began writing his second novel, Hunters in a Narrow Street, which was published in 1960.

Following his return to Baghdad, Jabra worked in public relations for the Iraq Petroleum Company and then for the Iraqi Ministry of Culture and Information. In Baghdad, he taught at various colleges and became a professor of English at the University of Baghdad.

Jabra became an Iraqi citizen. He was one of the first Palestinians to write about his experiences of being in exile. Jabra's home on Princesses' Street in the Mansour District of Baghdad was a meeting place for Iraqi intellectuals.

Much of his writing was concerned with modernism and Arab society. This interest led him to become, in the 1950s, a founding member of the Modern Baghdad Art Group, an artists' collective and intellectual movement that attempted to combine Iraq's profound artistic heritage with the methods of modernist abstract art. Although the Baghdad Modern Art Group was ostensibly an art movement, its members included poets, historians, architects and administrators. Jabra was deeply committed to the group's founder, Jawad Saleem and Saleem's ideals, and drew inspiration from Arab folklore, Arab literature and Islam.

Jabra's involvement in the artistic community continued with his becoming a founding member of the One Dimension Group, established by the prominent Baghdadi artist, Shakir Hassan Al Said in 1971. The group's manifesto gave voice to the group's commitment to both heritage and modernity and sought to distance itself from modern Arab artists, which the group perceived as following European artistic traditions. The One Dimension group was part of a broader movement among Arabic artists who rejected Western art forms and sought a new aesthetic, one that expressed their individual nationalism as well as their pan-Arab identity. This movement subsequently became known as the Hurufiyya movement.

Following his death in 1994, a relative, Raqiya Ibrahim, moved into his Baghdad home. However, the house was destroyed when a car bomb targeting the Egyptian embassy next door detonated on Easter Sunday in 2010, destroying much of the street and killing dozens of civilians. Thousands of Jabra's letters and personal effects were destroyed in this incident along with a number of his paintings.

== Work ==
As a poet, novelist, painter, translator and literary critic, Jabra was a versatile man of letters. He also translated many works of English literature into Arabic, including Shakespeare's major tragedies, William Faulkner's The Sound and the Fury, chapters 29–33 of Sir James Frazer's The Golden Bough and some of the work of T. S. Eliot. Jabra's own work has been translated into more than twelve languages, including English, French and Hebrew. His paintings are now difficult to locate, but a few notable works can be found in private collections.

Jabra was among the contributors of the poetry magazine Shi'r based in Beirut.

=== Bibliography ===
==== Novels ====
- Cry in a Long Night (Surakh fi layl tawil, 1955)
- Hunters in a Narrow Street (written in English; 1959)
- The Ship (al-Safinah, 1970)
- In Search of Walid Masoud: A Novel (al-Bahth 'an Walid Mas'ud, 1978)
- World Without Maps ('Alam bi-la khara'it, 1982; written with Saudi novelist Abdul Rahman Munif)
- The Other Rooms (al-Ghuraf al-ukhra, 1986)
- The Journals of Sarab Affan (Yawmiyyat Sarab 'Affan, 1992)

==== Short story collections ====
- Arak and Other Stories ('Araq wa-qisas ukhra, 1956)

==== Poetry collections ====
- Tammuz in the City (Tammuz fi al-madinah, 1959)
- Anguish of the Sun (Law'at al-shams, 1979)
- Closed Circle (al-Madar al-mughlaq, 1981)

==== Autobiographies ====
- The First Well: A Bethlehem Boyhood (al-Bi'r al-ula: fusul min sirah dhatiyyah, 1987)
- Princesses' Street: Baghdad Memories (Shari' al-amirat: fusul min sirah dhatiyyah, 1994)

==== Screenplays ====
- The Sun-King (al-Malik al-shams, 1986)
- Days of the Eagle (Ayyam al-'uqab, 1988)

==== Critical Studies ====
- Freedom and the Flood (al-Hurriyyah wa-l-tufan, 1960)
- The Eighth Journey (al-Rihlah al-thaminah, 1967)
- Contemporary Iraqi Art (al-Fann al-'iraqi al-mu'asir, 1972)
- Jawad Salim and the Freedom Monument (Jawad Salim wa-nusb al-hurriyyah, 1974)
- Fire and Essence (al-Nar wa-l-jawhar, 1975)
- Sources of Vision (Yanabi' al-ru'ya, 1979)
- The Grass Roots of Iraqi Art (Judhur al-fann al-'iraqi, 1984)
- Art, Dream, Action (al-Fann wa-l-hulm wa-l-fi'l, 1985)
- A Celebration of Life (Ihtifal-un li-l-hayah, 1988)
- Meditations on a Marble Monument (Ta'ammulat fi bunyan marmari, 1989)

==== Translations (English and French into Arabic) ====
- Adonis, or Tammuz (Adunis aw Tammuz, chapters 29–33 of The Golden Bough by Sir James Frazer, 1957)
- Before Philosophy: The Intellectual Adventure of Ancient Man by Henri Frankfort
- Sight and Insight by Alexander Eliot (translated as Afaq al-fann)
- The Sound and the Fury by William Faulkner
- Camus by Germaine Brée
- The Writer and His Craft, Being the Hopwood Lectures, 1932–1952 by various authors (translated as al-Adib wa-sina'atu-hu)
- The Life of the Drama by Eric Bentley
- Axel's Castle by Edmund Wilson
- Waiting for Godot by Samuel Beckett
- Shakespeare Our Contemporary by Jan Kott
- What Happens in Hamlet by John Dover Wilson
- The Tower of Babel by André Parrot
- Shakespeare and the Solitary Man by Janette Dillon
- The Happy Prince by Oscar Wilde
- Dry September, a collection of twelve modern English and American short stories

==== Translations of Shakespeare ====
- Hamlet
- King Lear
- Othello
- Macbeth
- Coriolanus
- The Tempest
- Twelfth Night
- Shakespeare's Sonnets: A Study with Forty Translated Sonnets (1983)

=== Paintings ===
- The Window (al-Nafidhah, 1951)
- Woman and Child (Imra'ah wa-tiflu-ha, early 1950s)
- The Brass-Seller (al-Safdar, 1955)

== See also ==
- Arabic novel
- Arabic art
- Hurufiyya movement
- Islamic art
- Iraqi art
- Islamic calligraphy
- List of Iraqi artists

== Works cited ==
- Jabrā, Jabrā Ibrāhīm (2005). Princesses' Street: Baghdad Memories. University of Arkansas Press. ISBN 978-1-55728-802-8.
