= Jamil Hamoudi =

Iraqi artist

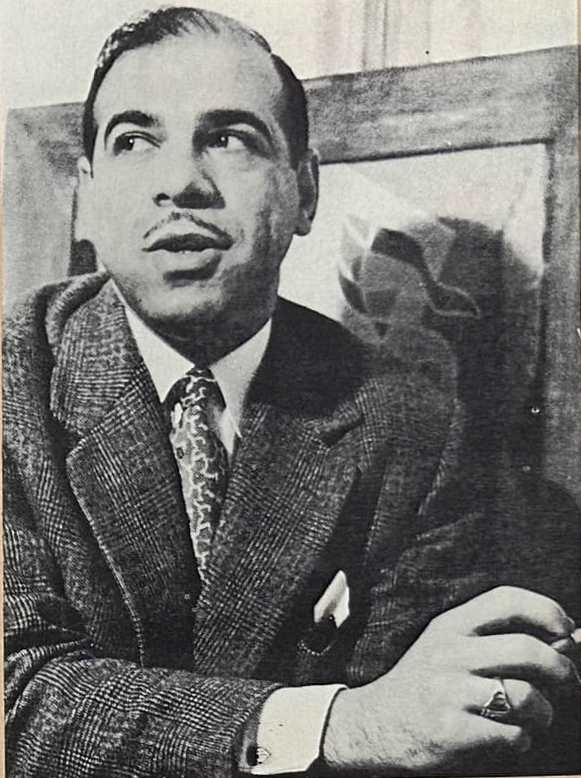
- Born: جميل حمودي; 1924
- Died: 2003 (aged 78–79)
- Education: Baghdad College of Fine Arts, École Nationale Supérieure des Beaux-Arts, Académie Julian, and École du Louvre
- Known for: Painter and sculptor
- Movement: Abstract art; One Dimension Group, Hurufiyya movement

Jamil Hamoudi (1924–2003) (Arabic: جميل حمودي) was an Iraqi artist who became the Director of the Ministry of Culture's Fine Arts Department. He is noted for his involvement in various Iraqi and Arabic art movements including the Hurufiyya movement which bridged the gap between traditional and modern Iraqi art.

== Life and career ==
Hamoudi started out as a self-taught sculptor in Baghdad. He developed a naturalistic style. In 1944, he was taken on to teach drawing and art history at a school in Baghdad. At the same time he attended classes at the Baghdad College of Fine Arts. He graduated in 1945 and in 1947, took a government scholarship to go to Paris, to study at the École Nationale Supérieure des Beaux-Arts, Académie Julian, and École du Louvre. He also Hamoudi researched the Assyrian-Babylonian art and languages.

In 1943, he created what has been described as the first Iraqi sculpture; a figure of the 11th-century philosopher-poet, Al-Maʿarri. By 1947, he was experimenting with abstract paintings using Arabic characters, and as such was one of the early pioneers of hurufiyya art. This led him on a path to discover the graphic possibilities of the letter in art.

Certain art historians regard him as the "founding father" of the hurufiyya movement (alphabetical art movement or Letrism movement). However, other scholars have suggested that the movement began somewhat earlier with the work of the Iraqi-American artist, Madiha Omar who exhibited huryifiyya artwork in 1949 in Washington. Whether he was the movement's founder, or simply helped to popularise the hurufiyya genre, there can be little doubt that he was a leading light in Iraq's modern art movement.

He defined his use of Arabic script in the context of rediscovering his own heritage, amid his studies of European art. He wanted to cling onto his own values and traditions as a means of avoiding being overtaken by experiences outside his own heritage. He wrote that there was nothing more sacred that the Arabic alphabet, saying that his art was "a form of prayer."

Hamoudi actively contributed to Iraqi arts culture through his membership of various art groups and societies in Iraq, and by organising exhibitions for up-coming artists, at a time when Iraq had no public galleries. In 1952, he organised an exhibition, entitled L'Ensemble "A" at the Institut Endoplastique in Paris. In 1971, he became a founding member of the One Dimension Group, started by his friend and colleague, artist and intellectual, Shakir Hassan Al Said. This group sought to use art as a means of developing a sense of national identity. Jamil defined his use of Arabic script as a rediscovery of Iraqi heritage, within the confines of European abstract art. Hamoudi and the art groups in which he was involved were largely responsible for bridging the gap between modernity and heritage, and establishing Iraqi modern art.

In 1973 he was appointed as Director of Fine Arts at the Ministry of Culture.

== Work ==
Hamoudi's early works reveal the influence of Cubism movement and later he identified himself with the surrealist movement. In time, however, he distanced himself from Surrealists, claiming:

"A dark, saturnine atmosphere emanated from [their canvases] the effect of which was to arouse a feeling of despair in human beings."

Ultimately, he developed his own style; one that referenced his Iraqi heritage, but also used modern techniques. His paintings are brightly colored and make use of geometric shapes like circles, triangles and arches, often in repeating patterns, a reference to Arabesque. For sculpture he frequently used plaster, stone, wood, metal, copper, glass, marble, Plexiglas and ceramics.

=== Publications ===
- Peintures, Sculptures, Dessins de Jamil HAMOUDI un artiste de Bagdad, Paris, Librairie Voyelle, 1950

=== Select list of paintings and drawings ===
- Sheytan, (The Devil), 1942, gouache on paper, 50 X 35 cm
- Composition Absraite, 1950, India ink and watercolor, 32 X 24 cm)
- Huryfieh , 1982, ink on paper, 70 X 100 cm
- Surat Abasa, 1982, pen on paper, 69 X 69 cm
- Ezkor Rabbak Eza Nasayt, (If Ever Forgetful Mention Allah), 1985 oil on canvas, 87 X 129 cm (now in the collection of the Barjeel Foundation)
- A Trip to Baghdad, 1996, oil on canvas, 69.5 X 69.5 cm

== See also ==
- Islamic art
- Islamic calligraphy
- List of Iraqi artists
