= Dia Azzawi =

Iraqi painter and sculptor (born 1939)

Dia al-Azzawi
- ضياء العزاوي
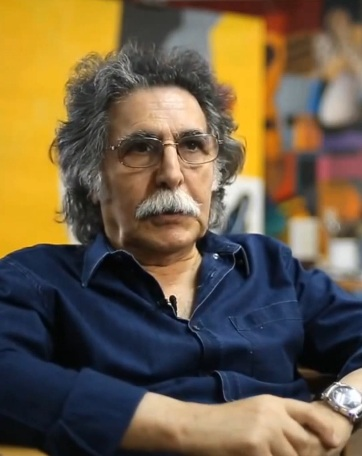
- Azzawi, 26 May 2015
- Born: 1939 (age 86–87); Baghdad, Kingdom of Iraq
- Education: College of Arts, Baghdad (archaeology)
- Known for: Painter, sculptor and author
- Movement: Hurufiyya movement
- Spouse: Kerstin Finstrom
- Website: Azzawiart.com

Dia al-Azzawi (Arabic: ضياء العزاوي; born 1939) is an Iraqi London-based visual artist. He attended the College of Arts, Baghdad.

== Life and career ==
Dia al-Azzawi was born in al-Fadhil, a neighborhood in Baghdad, in 1939, and was the third of ten children. His father was a grocer in the city center.

Azzawi studied archaeology at the College of Arts in Baghdad, graduating in 1962. Later, he studied at the Institute of Fine Arts under the guidance of Iraqi artist Hafidh al-Droubi. He studied topics about ancient Iraq as well as classical European painting. Azzawi explains, "This contrast meant that I was working with European principles, but at the same time, using my heritage as part of my work." His exposure to archaeology would influence him as an artist, drawing inspiration from the ancient myths of Gilgamesh and Imam Husayn, a revered Muslim figure and grandson of Muhammad, the Prophet of Islam. Azzawi continued to study art at the Institute and graduated in 1964.

In the 1950s, Azzawi began working with Iraqi artist Faeq Hassan, who was involved with the Baghdadi arts group known as the Pioneers. This group aimed to combine traditional and contemporary Iraqi art. During this period, he began to develop his own aesthetic and was inspired by Iraq's history.

While enrolled at art school, he joined a local art group known as the Impressionists, founded by his professor Hafidh al-Droubi in 1953. While Azzawi was not particularly drawn to impressionism as a style, the group encouraged artists to experiment with different styles and also to pursue local themes as subject matter. Through his involvement in this group, he began to explore Arab cultural history and mythology, which became recurring themes in his work. He continued his involvement in Iraq's arts community by joining the Baghdad Modern Art Group, founded by the artist and intellectual Shakir Hassan Al Said in 1951, and later the New Vision Group, for which Azzawi wrote the manifesto, published in a Baghdad newspaper in 1968.

During a turbulent political period in Iraq, Azzawi served as a reservist in the Iraqi army from 1966 to 1973, where he witnessed many atrocities. Through this experience, he learned that he needed to speak for those who had no voice. Several of his works are expressly designed to give a voice to those who have been silenced through war and conflict.

He worked as a director of the Iraqi Antiquities Department in Baghdad (1968–76) and artistic director of the Iraqi Cultural Centre in London, where he arranged a number of exhibitions. He was the inaugural editor of the magazine Ur (1978–1984), a provocative new journal published by the Iraqi Cultural Centre in London. He was also the editor of Fanon Arabiya (1981–2) and a member of the editorial board of the scholarly journal MA wakif.

He was still living in Iraq when he witnessed the demise of the avant-garde art groups. At this time, he became more actively involved in the arts community. In 1968, he founded the pivotal Iraqi art group Al-Raiyah al-Jaida (New Vision) and wrote its manifesto, Towards a New Vision, which is co-signed by Ismail Fatah Al Turk. Al-Raiyah al-Jadida represented a freer art style which encouraged artists to remain true to their own era and also to look to heritage and tradition for inspiration. In this respect, it sought to maintain the broad trends of the prior art groups, such as the Baghdad Modern Group, while at the same time acknowledging that artists were already developing a freer style. This group supported freedom of creativity within a framework of heritage. He was also a member of the group Al-Bu'd al-Wahad (One Dimension) founded by Shakir Hassan Al Said, which rejected the earlier modern Arab art movement as being too concerned with European techniques and aesthetics.

In the late 1970s, after Iraq fell under the control of Saddam Hussein, Azzawi left his home country and settled in London, where he met his first wife, the Swedish-born Kerstin Finston, who worked at the Patrick Seale Gallery, where Azzawi had his first solo British exhibition in 1978.

Azzawi lives and works in London and Dubai. In 1991, Azzawi fell into a state of despair when he saw the destruction to his native Iraq during the Gulf War. For several months, he focused on producing a series of works, including the Land of Darkness series of "violently drawn images of terrified, crying and screaming faces, [and] haunting images of despair."

He is considered part of the modern Arab art world, with an interest in the combination of Arabic traditions, including calligraphy, into modern art compositions.

In 2021, Tamayouz Excellence Award launched a prize named the Dia al-Azzawi Prize for Public Art; the recipient of the inaugural prize was the graffiti of Al-Tahrir tunnel in Baghdad by the Tishreen uprising artists.

In September 2025, Dia al-Azzawi held a solo exhibition titled False Witnesses at the Saleh Barakat Gallery in Beirut, in which he reflected on recent Iraqi political upheavals and regional conflicts through new works including charcoal drawings and an artist’s book.

== Works ==
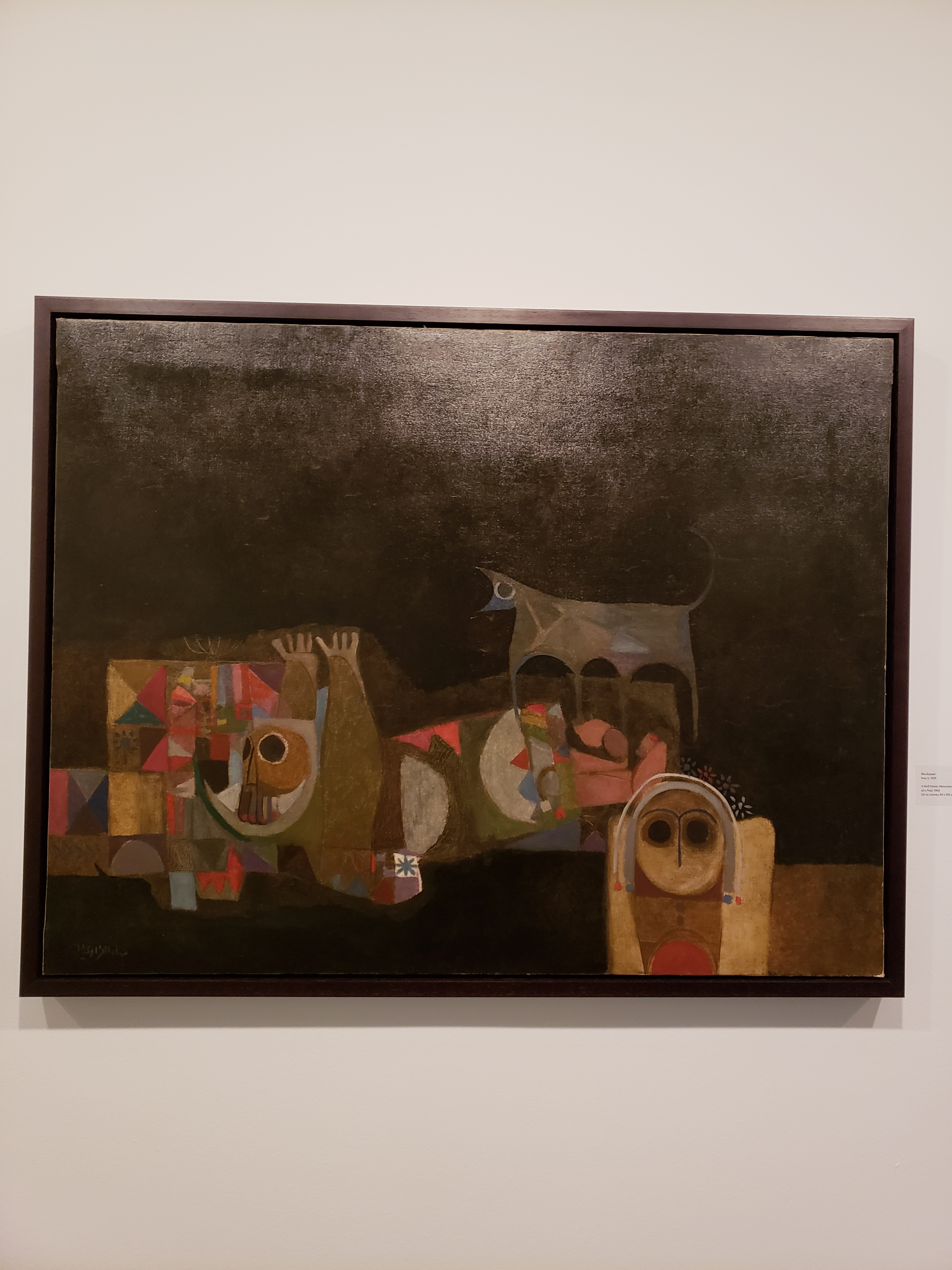
A Wolf Howls: Memories of a Poet (1968), by Dia Azzawi at the Barjeel Art Foundation collection

Azzawi was part of the generation of artists that saw their countries and homelands fall to bloody dictatorships and wars, and so much of his work is a commentary on the destruction and devastation of Iraq due to war and invasion. His piece, My Broken Dream, a colossal four-meter-tall and ten-meter-wide monochromatic work, is an assemblage of shapes, limps, and swords, and is an attempt to document a people's pain. In the written statement of the artwork, he writes, “Iraq is my inner soul."

In addition, Azzawi does not only give voice to his own plight, but to those who are silenced as well, including that of Palestine and Iraqi Kurdistan. One example, The Land of [Sad] Oranges, is a set of black and white drawings consisting of faceless heads and limp bodies, based on the short story collection of the same name by Palestinian writer Ghassan Kanafani. Azzawi was inspired to draw this set after Kanafani, a close friend of his, was murdered in 1972 by Mossad, and in these drawings, he tries to explore the condition of statelessness, particularly the effect it has on the individual. In an interview with journalist Saphora Smith for The Daily Telegraph in 2016, Azzawi said, “I feel I am a witness. If I can give a voice to somebody who has no voice, that is what I should do,” and with this work he tries to document the inner struggle of refugees and explore themes of exile and displacement.

The art historian Nada Shabout has classified Dia Azzawi's work as belonging to the School of Calligraphic Art (also known as the Hurufiyya movement), using a style termed calligraphic combinations, which means that he combines abstract, freeform, and classical styles.

His works are held in art galleries, art museums, and public collections in both the West and the Middle East: Vienna Public Collection; British Museum, London; Victoria and Albert Museum, London; Gulbenkian Collection, Barcelona; The World Bank, Washington D.C.; Library of Congress, Washington D.C.; Institut du Monde Arabe, Paris; Musée d'Art Moderne, Paris; Bibliothèque nationale, Paris; Pier Gardin Collection, Paris; Museum of Modern Art, Baghdad; Museum of Modern Art, Damascus; Museum of Modern Art, Tunis; Mathaf: Arab Museum of Modern Art, Doha; Adel Mandal Collection, Riyadh; The Saudi Bank, London; Jeddah International Airport, Saudi Arabia; Riyadh International Airport, Saudi Arabia; The United Bank of Kuwait, London; Development Fund, Kuwait; Una Foundation, Morocco; Jordan National Gallery of Fine Arts, Amman; and the British Airways Collection, London.

A number of his works, formerly held in the Iraq National Museum of Modern Art, were subject to the looting that occurred in 2003 following the US invasion of Iraq. At least one of these, The Lost City, rated as one of the top 100 missing works, has since been repatriated. The stolen artworks have been involved in controversy within the art circle. A private Iraqi seller offered The Lost City for sale with a $50,000 price tag to a gallery in 2011, in spite of the fact that it was listed by Interpol as a stolen artwork. With the assistance of the gallery, the US Embassy in Baghdad, Interpol, and the FBI, the work was eventually recovered and returned to the rightful owner, the Iraq National Museum of Modern Art.

Azzawi has published fourteen books, numerous articles, and has edited art magazines. He was the Art Director of the International Magazine of Arab Culture between 1978 and 1984.

== Artworks ==
Select list of artworks

- Demonstration, oil on canvas, 1953 (now in the Al-Rowed Collection, Baghdad)
- Story from One Thousand and One Nights, ink on paper, 1962
- And Morning Reached Shahrazad, ink on paper, 1962
- Tragedy at Kabala, ink on paper, 1964
- Testimony of Our Times, 1972
- The Land of Sad Oranges, 1973
- Introduction to the Seven Golden Orbs, silkscreen, 1978
- Al-Zawahiri Verses, 50 × 60 cm, 1989
- The Crane, hand-clouded lithograph, 1990
- Land of Darkness, series of nine charcoal drawings on paper, c. 1991
- The Mulallaqat, etching, 50 × 70 cm, date unknown
- Sabra and Chatila Massacre, 1982–1983 (currently in the Tate Modern Gallery)

== Public collections ==
- Tate Modern, London, UK
- Mathaf: Arab Museum of Modern Art, Doha, Qatar
- Sharjah Art Museum, Sharjah, UAE
- Barjeel Art Foundation, Sharjah, UAE

== See also ==
- Hurufiyya movement
- Islamic art
- Islamic calligraphy
- List of Iraqi artists
