= Kadhim Hayder =

Iraqi artist and writer (1932–1985)

- كاظم حيدر
- Born: 1932; Baghdad, Iraq
- Died: 1985 (aged 52–53); Baghdad, Iraq
- Education: Higher Institute for Teachers (1957); Institute of Fine Arts, Baghdad (1957); Royal School of Art, (1962)
- Known for: Painter, theatre set-designer, educator, author and poet

Kadhim Haydar (alternative: Kazem Haider) (1932–1985) was a highly respected Iraqi artist, poet, author, stage-set designer and educator who, as part of the first generation of modern Iraqi artists, had a major influence on the direction of modern Iraqi art. His artworks are noted for their use of symbolism, myth and poetic allegory within a contemporary framework.

== Life and career ==
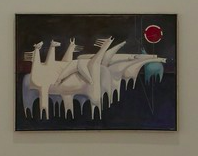
"Fatigued Ten Horses Converse with Nothing" (The Martyr’s Epic), by Kadhim Hayder (1965) at the Barjeel Art Foundation collection

Kadhim Haydar was born in Baghdad, Iraq, 1932 and grew up in Baghdad's Fadhl neighbourhood. From an early age, he exhibited a love of drawing and sketching. His drawings came to the attention of the artist, Mohammad Saleh Zaki, while Zaki was on a visit to Haydar's elementary school. In an interview, the artist recalled the event:

One day, Muhammad Saleh Zaki came to the classroom and asked us to paint a fish. Everyone drew the fish in a normal way, but I drew it diagonally. He asked me: I did not draw it this way .. I said: it is not dead yet !! He hit me on the shoulder and said to me: Become a painter.

He enrolled at the Higher Institute for Teachers where he studied Arabic literature. At the same time, he took evening classes in painting at Baghdad's Institute of Fine Arts and graduated from both colleges in 1957. He later studied theatre design and graphics at the Royal School of Art, in London, graduating in 1962. After returning to Baghdad from the UK, he taught at the Institute of Fine Arts (which in 1968 was renamed the Academy of Fine Arts and became part of Baghdad University). He became the Head of the Plastic Arts Department at the Academy (1981-2) and founded the Academy's Design Department in 1974.

He was very active in Iraq's arts community. During the 1950s, he was a member of the group known as the Pioneers, serving as its Vice-President between 1968 and 1972 and President in 1973. He was a foundation member of the influential Baghdad Modern Art Group) founded in 1951 by Jawad Saleem and Shakir Hassan Al Said; a group that consciously explored ways to integrate Iraq's ancient art heritage with modern techniques. In 1967, he joined the al-Zawiya Group (also known as the Corners Group or the Angle Group); a group founded by prominent Iraqi artist, Faeq Hassan, that wanted to use art for social and political commentary. Although this was a short-lived group, its members, included some of Iraq's most prominent artists including Kadhim Hayder along with Ismail Fattah, and Mohammed Ghani Hikmat. Hayder was not only involved with local arts communities, but was also active in the regional arts community and was a member of the Union of Arab Artists throughout the 1970s, serving as its President from 1975. Organised art related exhibitions and conferences.

Following the first Ba'ath coup of 1963, Haydar produced a series of paintings inspired by the annual street performances mourning the martyrdom of the Prophet Muhammad’s grandson, Husayn ibn Ali at the battle of Karbala. The thirty-two canvases, making up the series were exhibited in 1965 at Baghdad's National Museum of Modern Art in Baghdad under the title, The Epic of the Martyr [Malhamat ash-Shaheed]. One painting from this series, Fatigued Ten Horses Converse with Nothing (1965), which depicts a group of white horses weeping for the martyr, became very influential. The art critic and artist, Shakir Hassan Al Said said that it was a "catalyst for young artists to seek new visions of metaphysical and sometimes metaphysical dimensions."

He was also a writer and a poet with various publications including Al-Takhtit wal Elwan [Sketching and Colours] which became a standard text book at Academy of Fine Arts. His most well-known poem is Melhamet al-Shahid [The Martyr] (1965).

Hayder died in Baghdad in 1985, following a battle with cancer. He has been described as one of the most respected Iraqi artists of the 20th-century, and his powerful artworks demonstrate his mastery of myth, poetic allegory and symbolism.

== Work ==
His earliest works drew inspiration from the suffering of the Iraqi labourer - the paintings Al-Himal [The Porter] (1955); He Told Us How It Happened (1957) and The Struggle of the Hero (1959) are characteristic of this period in which he presents workers as heroes with well-developed musculature, chiselled features and an imposing presence as they faced their daily struggless. His later work sought to combine his passion for Iraqi literature, poetic allegory, symbolism and abstraction into works that were primarily narrative and dealt with themes of good versus evil. For instance, he employed ancient aesthetic principles such as repeating geometric patterns derived from ancient Mesopotamian art traditions. He also included poetry in some of his artworks.

While he dabbled with stage design in the 1950s, he became much more seriously engaged in set-design and costume-design for theatre productions after meeting Sami Abdul Hamid and Qasim Mohammad in London in the 1960s. His first work as a set designer was for the play, Treasures of Granada. He then followed with various sets for the Modern Theater Group. He designed sets for The Merchant of Venice; Antigonea; The Epic of Gilgagmash; Glass Animals; The Shariah; The Arab Hamlet and Old Baghdad Between the Grandfather, the Hazzan, the Khan. One of his ideas was to make the curtains visible, thereby giving the audience the idea that the most important facets of life took place behind the scenes. He played an important role in the development of modern Iraqi theatre.

The art-critic, Farouq Youssif, described Haydar as part of a group of nihilistic artists, who were preoccupied with themes of death and martyrdom.

"Since the mid 1950s, Khadem Haydar tackled the subject of man and his crisis... He portrayed life by using masks, actors and colourful backgrounds. The conflict of all these elements materialized the tragedy of life which was renewed by the presence of brightness and darkness, good and evil, space and mass."

He exhibited his work frequently, with ten solo exhibitions in Baghdad such as Baghdad's First Arab Biennial in 1974 and also exhibited internationally in London, the Middle East and Paris where he exhibited at the Musée d'Art Moderne de la Ville de Paris in 1974. His artworks are in private and public collections world-wide.

Select list of paintings

- Al-Himal [The Porter], 1955
- He Told Us How It Happened 1957
- The Struggle of the Hero, 1959
- The Epic of the Martyr [Series of 32 canvases of varying sizes], 1965-1967
- And a Horse is Selling oil on canvas, 24 3/8 x 38 3/8 in. (62 x 97.5cm.), 1965
- Do'a'a li al qamar raqam 17 [Prayer to the Moon no. 17], oil on canvas, 30 3/8 x 22 ¾in. (77 x 57.7cm.)1969
- Al Buraq oil on canvas, 51 1/8 x 67in. (130 x 170cm.), c. 1969
- Thalathat Ashkhas Raqm [Three People], oil on canvas, 21 7/8 x 29 ½in. (55.5 x 75cm.), c. 1970
- Al-Kafafin Coffee House oil on canvas, 51.18 in X 39.37 in. (130.00 X 100.00 cm.), date unknown
- Motherhood oil on canvas, 18.50 X 15.75 in (47.00 X 40.00 cm.), date unknown

Books and Poetry

- Lines and Colours book [at-Takhteet wa al-Alwaan]
- The Martyr poem

== See also ==
- Iraqi art
- List of Iraqi artists
