= Madiha Omar =

Iraqi artist (1908–2005)

- Born: مديحة عمر; 1908; Aleppo
- Died: 2005 (aged 96–97); Amman
- Education: Sultaniyya School, Istanbul; Maria Grey Training College, London; George Washington University, Washington (education); Corcoran School of Art, Washington (fine arts)
- Known for: Abstract art, Modern Arab art
- Notable work: Madiha Umar Estate Collection under responsibility of Dara Kittani, her grandson
- Movement: One Dimension Group; Hurufiyya movement
- Spouse: Yasin Omar

Madiha Omar (1908 – 2005 in Aleppo) (Arabic: مديحة عمر) was an Iraqi artist who was known for incorporating calligraphy with abstract art. She is generally perceived as the first Arab artist to have done this. Therefore, she is seen as the precursor to the Hurufiyya movement. Also, Omar was the first woman to receive a scholarship from the Iraqi government to study in Europe.

== Life and career ==
Madiha Omar was born in Aleppo, Ottoman Empire, now Syria. Her father was Circassian and her mother was Syrian; mixed parentage was typical in the multicultural Turkish Empire. However, the family moved to Iraq when she was a young girl. Omar attended the Sultaniyya School in Istanbul, where she drew praise from Ali Riza for her painting skills. She then trained as a teacher at the Maria Grey Training College in London in the 1930s, graduating with First class honours in Arts and Crafts in 1933. She then taught painting at the Academy of Fine Arts in Baghdad, becoming head of department before leaving in 1942. She became a naturalised Iraqi.

In 1939, she married Yasin Omar, a diplomat. In 1942, she moved to Washington to accompany her husband, whose appointment as a member of the Iraqi Commission took him to the capital. In the US, she came across a book on Arabic calligraphy by Islamic scholar, Nabia Abbott and this inspired her to explore the possibilities of incorporating letters into her artwork.

She first began to explore the idea of integrating Arabic letters into painting in the 1940s, and in 1949, with the encouragement of art historian, Richard Ettinghausen, she exhibited a series of 22 hurufist-inspired paintings at Georgetown Public Library in Washington. For this, she generally earns the reputation as the first Arab artist of the modern era to have incorporated Arabic letters into her art, and the first artist to have exhibited such works. Later in the same year, she wrote the book, Arabic Calligraphy: An Element of Inspiration in Abstract Art.

In 1952, Omar participated in the Ibn Sina exhibition, held at the Art Institute in Baghdad with 48 paintings, all of which employed Arabic letters in a modern, secular artwork. This event brought her work to the attention of Middle-Eastern artists. She has been variously acclaimed as the pioneer of a movement or as the precursor to the movement that now carries the name, Huryfiyya art movement.

She studied education at the George Washington University; then studied fine arts at the Corcoran School of Art, graduating in 1952 and received a MFA in 1959.

In 1971 she joined the One Dimension Group founded by Shakir Hassan Al Said; a group that sought to synthesise indigenous art with European trends and successfully bridged the gap between heritage and modernity.

== See also ==
- Iraqi art
- Islamic art
- Islamic calligraphy
- List of Iraqi artists
- List of Iraqi women artists
