= Lalla Essaydi =

Moroccan photographer (born 1956)

- Born: Lalla Assia Essaydi; 1956 (age 69–70); Marrakesh, Morocco
- Education: École nationale supérieure des Beaux-Arts, Paris; Tufts University, Boston; School of the Museum of Fine Arts, Boston
- Known for: Photographer
- Notable work: Les Femmes du Maroc: Grande Odalisque 2
- Movement: Hurufiyya movement
- Website: http://lallaessaydi.com/

Lalla Assia Essaydi (Arabic: لالة السعيدي; born 1956) is a Moroccan photographer known for her staged photographs of Arab women in contemporary art. She currently works in Boston, Massachusetts, and Morocco. Her current residence is in New York.

== Early life and education ==
Lalla Assia Essaydi was born in Marrakesh, Morocco, in 1956. She left to attend high school in Paris, France, at the age of 16. She married after returning to Morocco and moved to Saudi Arabia, where she had two children and divorced. Essaydi returned to Paris in the early 1990s to attend the École nationale supérieure des Beaux-Arts. She moved to Boston, United States, in 1996, earning her BFA from Tufts University in 1999 and her MFA in painting and photography from the School of the Museum of Fine Arts in 2003.

== Work ==
Bullets Revisited #3 (2012), National Museum of Women in the Arts, Washington, D.C.

Influenced by her experiences growing up in Morocco and Saudi Arabia, Essaydi explores the ways that gender and power are inscribed on Muslim women's bodies and the spaces they inhabit. She has stated that her work is autobiographical and that she was inspired by the differences she perceived in women's lives in the United States versus in Morocco, in terms of freedom and identity. She explores a wide range of perspectives, including issues of diaspora, identity, and expected location through her studio practice in Boston. The inspiration for many of her works came from her childhood, in the physical space where she, as a young woman, was sent when she had disobeyed. She stepped outside the permissible behavioral space, as defined by Moroccan culture. Essaydi said her works are haunted by spaces she inhabited as a child.

Several pieces of her work (including Converging Territories) combine henna, which is traditionally used to decorate the hands and feet of brides, with Arabic calligraphy, a predominantly the male practice. While Essaydi uses henna to apply calligraphy to her female subjects' bodies, the words are indecipherable in an attempt to question authority and meaning.

The women depicted in her exhibition of photographs, Les Femmes du Maroc, are represented as decorative and confined by the art of henna. Essaydi thus poses her subjects in a way that exemplifies society's views of women as primarily destined for mere beauty. Henna, however, is extremely symbolic, especially to Moroccan women. It is an association with familial celebrations of a young girl reaching puberty and transitioning into a mature woman. The use of henna in her work creates a silent atmosphere of women "speaking" to each other through a quality of femininity. It is predominantly a painting process where women who are discouraged from working outside the home find profitable work in applying a tattoo-like material. Beyond creating powerful pieces revolving around the art of henna, Essaydi includes interpretations of traditional Moroccan elements, including draped folds of cloth adorning women's bodies, mosaic, tiles, and Islamic architecture.

=== Converging Territories ===
Initiated in the early 2000s, Essaydi's photographic series Converging Territories captures women dressed in white, covered in Arabic calligraphy written with henna, positioned within traditional Moroccan domestic spaces. As Islamic calligraphy was typically only taught to men, Essaydi, a self-taught calligrapher, portrayed this writing on her subjects to embrace the gender roles of her cultural heritage. The scenes portrayed are a distinct form of resistance, allowing the women depicted to claim the spaces as their own and rewrite the narratives of their lived experiences. Essaydi's meticulous process involves hours of hand-painting the henna calligraphy on her subjects and their environments. The resulting images in "Converging Territories" are a critique of the patriarchal structures while celebrating the strength and resilience of Arab women. Converging Territories has been exhibited at the New Britain Museum of American Art, the Joel Soroka Gallery, the Anya Tish Gallery, Jackson Fine Art, the Lisa Sette Gallery, the Columbus Museum of Art, the Howard Yezerski Gallery, and the Laurence Miller Gallery.

== Artist Statement ==
In her artist statement, she says that her first need to start photography came from the need to photograph actual spaces. In order to do this, she needed to move back home to Morocco where she had grown up. This helped her the woman she had become as she grew older. The spaces that she began to photograph were ones that metaphorically shaped her childhood. She states that "art can only from the heart of an individual artist," and her goal for her art is to document her own experience as an Arab woman that she sees now from a different perspective. Her art is also a quest to find her own voice and not to show herself as a victim.

== Exhibitions ==
Her work has been exhibited at the National Museum of African Art. In 2015, the San Diego Museum of Art mounted the exhibition, Lalla Essaydi: Photographs. Essaydi's work was featured in the 2017 exhibition, Revival, at the National Museum of Women in the Arts in Washington, DC.

== Collections ==
Her work is represented in several collections, including the Art Institute of Chicago; the Museum Five Continents; the San Diego Museum of Art; the Cornell Fine Arts Museum, Winter Park, Florida; the Fries Museum in Leeuwarden, The Netherlands; the Museum of Fine Arts, Boston; the National Museum of Women in the Arts; and the Williams College Museum of Art in Williamstown, Massachusetts.

== Awards ==
She was named at number 18 in Charchub's "Top 20 Contemporary Middle Eastern Artists in 2012–2014".

In 2012, she received a Medal Award from the School of the Museum of Fine Arts, Boston.
