= Al-Bu'd al-Wahad =

20th-century Iraqi modern art group

The One Dimension Group (Arabic: مجموعة البُعد الواحد Al Bu'd al Wahad) was a modern art collective founded in Iraq, by Shakir Hassan Al Said in 1971 which attempted to combine medieval Sufi traditions with contemporary, abstract art. Although the One Dimension Group was founded in Iraq, its members originated from across Arab nations, and its influence was felt across the Arab art world.

== Background ==
One Dimension is one of a number of art groups that formed in 20th-century Iraq. During the first world war, a small group of European officers and artists settled in Iraq, exposing young artists to Western art traditions and techniques. While local artists and middle classes developed an appreciation for European art, the arts community searched for ways of synthesising indigenous art with international trends. In effect, these groups were seeking to forge an Arabic art aesthetic and to use art to help their nations reassert a sense of national identity.

Between the 1930s and the early 1970s, more than six different art groups were formed: The Pioneers formed in the 1930s; The Avantgarde Group formed in 1950; The Baghdad Modern Art Group formed in 1951; The Impressionists formed in 1953; The Corners Group founded in 1961; The Innovationists founded in 1963; The New Vision founded in 1968 and One Dimension founded in 1971. Some of these groups endured for decades, while others were short-lived and abandoned within a few years of their formation.

Each of these groups developed different ideas about how to combine heritage and modernity and developed a different vision for a national art aesthetic. Although there were tensions in the different visions of these groups, collectively, they actively searched for new national vision which would enable the country to develop internally, as well as take its place on a world stage.

Of these art groups, the Baghdad Modern Art Group and the One Dimension Group are the most frequently cited.

== Brief history and philosophy ==
The One Dimension Group was established formally in 1971 by the prominent Baghdadi artist and intellectual, Shakir Hassan Al Said, when he published a manifesto for the group. Al Said had previously been a founding member of the Baghdad Group for Modern Art (Jama'at Baghdad lil-Fann al-Hadith) together with Jawad Saleem (1919-1961) and Jabra Ibrahim Jabra (1919-1994), but he along with several high profile artists, had withdrawn from that group when it lost its sense of direction, following the death of its founder, Jawad Saleem in 1961.

The One Dimension manifesto gives voice to the group's commitment to both heritage and modernity and sought to distance itself from the modern Arab artists which they perceived as following European artistic traditions. One Dimension's objectives are complex and sophisticated; it is philosophy, technique, style and a relationship between time and space, between the visual and the non-visual. The "one dimension" is an oblique reference to Sufism, which has been described as "the inner dimension of Islam." The objectives of the One Dimension Group were multi-dimensional and complex. At the most basic level, the group rejected two and three-two dimensional artwork in favour of a single "inner dimension". This approach was influenced by both the philosophy of Martin Heidegger and the traditions of Arabic calligraphy and associated Sufi movements. In practice, a single inner dimension was difficult to realise because most artworks are produced on two-dimensional surfaces. At a more profound level, one dimension refers to "eternity". Al Said explained:

"From a philosophical point of view, the One-Dimension is eternity, or an extension of the past to the time before the existence of pictorial surface; to the non-surface. Our consciousness of the world is a relative presence. It is our self-existence while our absence is our eternal presence."

Al Said actively searched for relationships between time and space; and for a visual language that would connect Iraq's deep art traditions with modern art methods and materials. The incorporation of callij (calligraphy) letters into modern artworks was an important aspect of this relationship. The letter became part of Al Said's transition from figurative art to abstract art. Arabic calligraphy was charged with intellectual and esoteric Sufi meaning, in that it was an explicit reference to a medieval theology where letters were seen as primordial signifiers and manipulators of the cosmos.

Al Said, and members of the One Dimension group, searched for a new artistic identity, drawn from within their own culture and heritage and successfully integrated Islamic visual traditions, especially calligraphy and Arabic motifs, into contemporary, abstract compositions. At an individual level, these artists were carrying out their own dialogue with national identity and modern art, at a broader level they also worked towards an aesthetic that transcended national boundaries and represented a broader affiliation with an Arab identity. Al Said and his group successfully bridged the gap between modernity and heritage. In so doing, they "charted a new Arabo-Islamic art aesthetic, and thus initiated a possible alternative for art valuating for local and regional art other than those allowed through an exclusionary Western canon of art history."

In focusing on the Arabic letter as the central element of his work, al-Said soon was collaborating with Madiha Omar (who by then was living in the US) and Jamil Hamoudi, who both joined his group. The One Dimension Group was very significant to the so-called School of Calligraphic Art (also known as the Hurufiyya movement) which comprised groups of artists that had emerged independently across North Africa and the Middle East in the second half of the 20th century, with the common thread being that each group searched for ways to integrate tradition and modernity in a way that would contribute to a distinct national style.

Although each of these groups developed locally, and went by different labels at the local level, collectively, these groups and their practitioners would become known as the School of Calligraphy (or Hurufiyya movement). In Jordan, the movement emerged in the 1950s and was known as the Al-hurufiyyah movement, while in Iraq, the movement was known as Al Bu'd al Wahad (or the One Dimension Group)", and in Iran, the Saqqa-Khaneh movement. In Sudan, artworks took on a slightly different form - since artists rejected Western art traditions and included both Islamic calligraphy and West African motifs. In Sudan, the movement was known as the Old Khartoum School.

Original members of the One Dimension group include: Rafa al-Nasiri, Mohammed Ghani Hikmat, Nuri al-Rawi, Dia Azzawi, Jamil Hamoudi, Hashem Samarchi (b. 1939), Hashim al-Baghdadi (1917-1973) and Saad Shaker (1935-2005).

== See also ==
- Arabic art
- Iraqi art
- Islamic art
- Islamic calligraphy
- Hurufiyya movement
- List of Muslim painters
- List of Iraqi artists
