= In Search of Walid Masoud: A Novel =

Palestinian novel

In search of Walid Masoud
- Syracuse University Press edition (2000)
- Author: Jabra Ibrahim Jabra
- Language: Arabic
- Publication date: 1978

In Search of Walid Masoud is a novel by the Palestinian writer Jabra Ibrahim Jabra, published for the first time in 1978. It was ranked the second-best Arabic-language novel by the Arab Writers Union in 2010.

== Plot ==
The novel's main character is Walid Masoud, a Palestinian banker, womanizer, and rebel who fights against the Israeli occupation of Palestine. Masoud has disappeared near the Iraq-Syrian border, and his friends try to discover what happened to him. The narrator discovers a cassette tape that Masoud had recorded, and arranges for his acquaintances to listen to it, hoping to find clues about his whereabouts.

The author shows how Walid Masoud's character was shaped by his upbringing in Palestine and details his turbulent emotional life. The plot delves into his multiple relationships with women and his religious and political positions. The novel is told from the perspective of several different people who knew Walid Masoud, including Masoud himself, through excerpts from his memoirs.

== Critique ==
In Search of Walid Masoud carried the features of novelistic modernity in the Arab world, as it is, to this day, unique in its format and is a meeting point between the peculiarities of Arabic writing and the international novel. On the other hand, the novel is considered a shorthand for Jabra Ibrahim Jabra's narrative career. Jabra Ibrahim Jabra's novel In Search of Walid Masoud is considered one of the most famous of his work as "The discourse in this novel revolves around the Palestinian Walid Masoud, who announces by his disappearance his symbolic existence and makes those around him look for themselves in searching for him and determine their fates according to this research. Jabra may have exaggerated this little or too much." The discourse in the novel captures the behaviors, values, and social contradictions prevailing in the Baghdadi society, and society is a symbol and a study of the narrative sample of the Arab city society. "In Search of Walid Masoud talks about searching for one's self, and searching for identity, presenting the crisis of place for the Palestinian in his exile and alienation. It explores the personalities and their psychological and intellectual contradictions, and by that painting a picture of the Palestinian intellectual in his loss and suffering.
