= Golnaz Fathi =

Iranian artist

- Born: 1972 (age 53–54); Tehran, Iran
- Education: Islamic Azad University; Iranian Society of Calligraphy
- Known for: Painter
- Movement: Hurufiyya movement

Golnaz Fathi (born 1972) is an Iranian contemporary artist noted for her artwork in the hurufiyya tradition.

== Life and career ==
She was born in Tehran and studied graphic design at Islamic Azad University, receiving a BA in 1995. She went on to study traditional Persian calligraphy, receiving a diploma from the Iranian Society of Calligraphy. Fathi was named Best Woman Calligraphist by the Iranian Society of Calligraphy in 1995.

Fathi has developed her own abstract style derived from the practice of traditional calligraphy. Unlike traditional calligraphy, her painting features strong brushstrokes and vibrant colour. Although her work may include Arabic letters, Fathi wants it to be viewed as abstract images rather than as text. For continuing the use of calligraphy in abstract designs, she is seen as part of the broader, hurufiyya art movement. Art historian, Rose Issa, has described her work as that of a third generation huryifiyya artist.

Her work has appeared in solo shows in London, New York City, Shanghai, Hong Kong, Singapore, Dubai, Doha, Manama, Kuwait City, and Beirut. Her work is included in the collections of the British Museum and the Metropolitan Museum of Art.

== See also ==
- Iranian art
- Islamic art
- Islamic calligraphy
