= May Muzaffar =

Jordan-based Iraqi poet, short story writer, translator, and editor

May Muzaffar (born 1940; Arabic: مظفر, مي) is a Jordan-based Iraqi poet, short story writer, translator, and editor.

== Early life and education ==
May Muzaffar was born in Baghdad, Iraq, in 1940. She attended the University of Baghdad, where she studied English literature.

== Writing ==
Muzaffar is known for her work as a writer of poetry and short stories, as well as literary criticism. She has produced five story collections, including Al Baja (1973). In addition, she has published five poetry collections, including Layliyyat ("Nocturnes," 1994), Barid al-Sharq ("Mail from the Orient," 2003), and Ghiyab ("Absence," 2014).

She has also written nonfiction, including a biography of the writer Nasir al-Din al-Asad. In 2021, she published a memoir that shared her love story with her late husband and mourned the Iraq of her youth; it was released in English translation in 2023 as Story of Water and Fire. Other work published in English translation includes a contribution to the 2000 collection The Poetry of Arab Women: A Contemporary Anthology.

She has also worked as a translator and editor. Her translations into Arabic include poetry from Ted Hughes and Etel Adnan, and she has served as a contributing editor to the Bahraini literary journal Thaqafat.

Her writing from the 1970s to 1990 is seen as an important example of Iraqi women writers prevailing despite state censorship and discrimination. In 1991, she left Iraq for Amman, Jordan, where she continues to reside and work, as part of a wave of Iraqi writers and artists who emigrated in this period.

== Personal life ==
May Muzaffar was married to the late Iraqi artist Rafa al-Nasiri, whom she first met in 1971. The couple often collaborated, including on the poetry collection/art book From That Distant Land in 2007. Since his death in 2013, she has worked to preserve and promote his work and legacy.
