= Lisa Fattah =

German-born artist of Swedish descent

- Born: 1941; Germany
- Died: 1992 (aged 50–51); Baghdad, Iraq
- Education: Accademia di Belle Arti di Roma; Real Academia de Bellas Artes de San Fernando, Madrid
- Known for: Painter
- Spouse: Ismail Fattah

Lisa Fattah (1941–1992) was a German-Swedish artist who spent the majority of her life in Iraq. Her works often express her anger in expressionistic style which is uncommon for Iraq at the time. Her work was often rebellious and strong, serve as a respond to the condition of life in Iraq. Lisa's most well-known appearance was in the 2002 exhibition Breaking the Veils: Women Artists from the Islamic World. She participated in many events, such as, the twenty-second exhibition of the Iraqi Artists Association, exhibition of contemporary Arab artists, and the seventh anniversary of ruling party exhibition.

== Life and career ==
Marie-Luise Schiek or Lisa Fattah was born to German parents in the capital of Norway, Oslo, in 1941, during the height of the Second World War.

Fattah studied at the Accademia di Belle Arti di Roma, graduating in 1963, and the Real Academia de Bellas Artes de San Fernando in Madrid. While she was in Rome, she met an Iraqi artist Ismail Fattah, who later became her husband. She moved to Baghdad alongside Ismail after she concluded her study.

Later on in life after the death of her father, she was diagnosed with leukemia, before dying in Baghdad in 1992.

== Work ==
Her work often expresses her anger at the violence experienced by the Iraqi people and often are very feminist in nature. Her painting “Aggression” was included in the exhibition Breaking the Veils: Women Artists from the Islamic World. It is now held in the collection of the Jordan National Gallery of Fine Arts.

== Works ==
List of notable works

- Nailed Head, 1988, Oil on canvas, 105 x 95 cm, Ibrahimi Collection.
- Untitled, 1988, Acrylic and ink on cardboard, 87.5 x 68 cm, Dalloul Art Foundation.
- Portrait of Artist's Daughter, 1978, Oil on canvas, 90 x 85 cm, Ibrahimi Collection.
- Untitled, 1986, Acrylic on canvas, 1986, 147 x 99.5 cm, Dalloul Art Foundation.
- Engorged Face, Oil on canvas, 1985, 75 x 55 cm, Ibrahimi Collection.
- Blackness Everywhere, Oil on canvas, 95 x 100 cm, Ibrahimi Collection.
- Self Portrait, 1984, Oil on canvas, 60 x 60 cm, Ibrahimi Collection.
- When I Knew That I Will Not See My Mother Again, 1982, Mixed media on canvas, 115 x 85 cm, Ibrahimi Collection.

== Exhibition ==
Lisa Fattah is known for innovative approach to her art, being inspired by German-expressionism movement. She has showcased her works which explore the theme of identity, memory, and mankind through many of her exhibitions.

Fattah has participated in various fairs and festival; such as, Cultural festival of AL-Thawra newspaper and International Festival for Plastic Art.

Additionally, she also participated in exhibitions, including the Seventh anniversary of the ruling party exhibition, Twenty-second exhibition of Iraqi Artists Association, Third exhibition of contemporary Arab artists, Exhibition “Three Iraqi Artists (Ismail Fattah, Lisa Fattah, and Mohammad Muhraddin)”, and FIAC exhibition.

== Recognition ==
Since 1964, Lisa Fattah received many awards and exhibited her works in many exhibitions. Through her career, she was famous for challenging viewers' perception to engage with complex emotion through contemporary art.

- 1964 - Bachelor's degree in Art, Royal Academy of Fine Arts of San Fernando
- 1974 - Cultural festival of AL-Thawra newspaper, Baghdad
- 1980 - Seventh anniversary of the ruling party exhibition, Baghdad
- 1981 - Twenty-second exhibition of Iraqi Artists Association, Baghdad
- 1983 - Third exhibition of contemporary Arab artists, London
- 1986 - Baghdad International Festival for Plastic Art, Baghdad
- 1992 - Exhibition “Three Iraqi Artists (Ismali Fattah, Lisa Fattah, and Mohammad Mahruddin)”, Amman
- 1992 - FIAC exhibition, Paris
- 2000 - “Journey with Contemporary Arts in Arab World - Contemporary Artists from Mesopotamia’, Amman
- 2008 - 2011 “Breaking the Barriers: Female Artists from Islamic World”, United States of America

== Collections ==
Lisa's works are published within many collections, including the ‘Reflection of woman in Iraq’ Ibrahimi Collection and Dalloul Art Foundation.

== See also ==
- Islamic art
- Iraqi art
- List of Iraqi artists
