= Khairat Al-Saleh =

- خيرت الصالح
- Born: 1940 (age 85–86); Jerusalem
- Education: University of Wales, Swansea (English literature)
- Known for: Painter, poet, author
- Movement: Hurufiyya movement
- Website: KhairatSaleh

Khairat Al-Saleh (Arabic: خيرت الصالح), born in Jerusalem and educated in Syria and Egypt, is a noted painter in the Hurufiyya movement and a ceramicist, glassmaker, and printmaker.

== Life and career ==
Khairat Al-Saleh was born in Jerusalem in 1940. She was educated at University of Wales Swansea, where she studied English literature and poetry, and works as a ceramist, glassmaker, printmaker, and painter, living between England and Syria. She is noted for her use of calligraphy and miniatures. Inspired by Arab and Islamic art, she experimented with the art of illuminated manuscripts, arabesque, and geometric design in her paintings, prints, and ceramics.

As a poet, her work is closely linked to illumination, illustration, and the art of the book. Nevertheless, in her art she also explored the liberating effects of watercolour techniques, and even digital art. She trained as a printmaker and ceramist in Richmond, but she is mainly self‑taught as an artist. She has exhibited in London (several times at Leighton House Museum), and in many European and Arab countries. Presently she is producing works of art and writing under a pen name in Britain. She has also published a book, entitled Fabled Cities, Princes and Jinn from Arab Myths and Legends, which has been translated into many languages.

As a visual artist, Al‑Saleh works in ceramics, glass, prints, and paintings (watercolours and gouache). All her work reflects her Arabic identity. The art historian Wijdan Ali classifies her paintings as belonging to the Neoclassical style within the Hurufiyya movement, which means that she follows the rules of calligraphy established by 13th‑century Sufi calligraphers.

== Work ==
Al‑Saleh's work is held in major public art collections, including:

- The National Art Gallery, Amman, Jordan
- GATT Gallery, UN, Geneva
- World Museum, Rotterdam
- Darat al Funun, Amman, Jordan
- Westminster Bank, London

=== Exhibitions ===
- 2001‑2002: Contemporary Arab Art, curated by Egee Art Consultancy, London, held at the Wereldmuseum, Rotterdam, 6 June 2001 to 24 March 2002
- 2004: Symbols of Harmony: Art from the Islamic World, curated by the Ayagallery and held at the Kent County Gallery, 3 January – 29 March 2004

== See also ==
- Calligraphy
- Islamic art
- Islamic calligraphy
- Palestinian art
