= Philip Michael Wolfson =

American artist (born 1958)

Philip Michael Wolfson (born 1958) is an American artist who worked as head of design for architect Zaha Hadid and now has his studio.

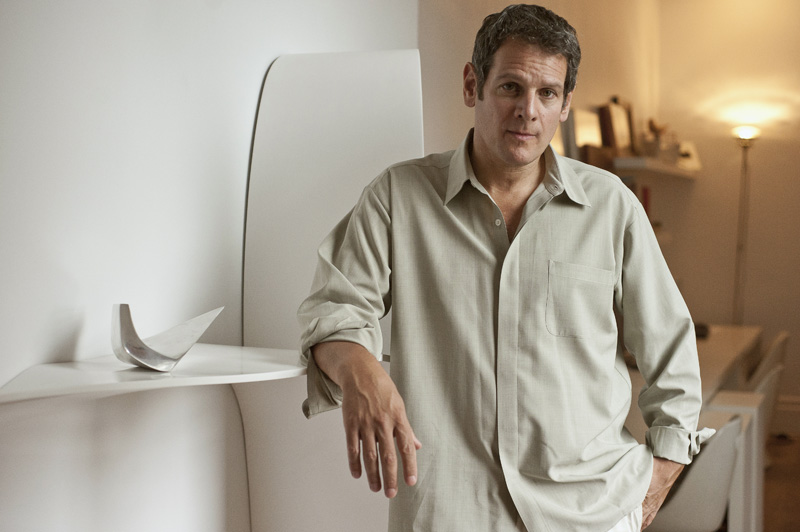
Portrait of Philip Michael Wolfson

== Early life and education ==
He studied architecture at Cornell University and the Architectural Association, London. He then worked with architect Zaha Hadid for 10 years, becoming her head of design. He founded his own studio in 1991.

== Career ==
Wolfson is influenced stylistically by constructivism and futurism. He uses wood, glass, metal and stone, as well as new materials, such as carbon fiber, in his designs. Works by Wolfson have been shown at, or are included in numerous international collections including the Victoria and Albert Museum (London. UK), the Foundation Cartier (Paris, FR), and the Price Tower Arts Center (Bartlesville, US). His designs are on display at international galleries (Contrasts, Shanghai; Franziska Kessler, Zurich; Sebastian + Barquet, New York) and at international art fairs (Art Basel, Design Miami, Milan Furniture Fair, Milan, TEFAF, Maastricht).

He designed furniture pieces for the Robert restaurant at New York's Museum of Arts and Design.
