= Hurufiyya movement =

Art movement drawing upon Islamic calligraphy

The Hurufiyya movement (Arabic: حروفية ḥurūfiyyah adjectival form ḥurūfī, 'of letters' of the alphabet) is an aesthetic movement that emerged in the second half of the twentieth century amongst artists from Muslim countries, who used their understanding of traditional Islamic calligraphy within the precepts of modern art. By combining tradition and modernity, these artists worked towards developing a culture-specific visual language, which instilled a sense of national identity in their respective nation-states when many of these states were shaking off colonial rule and asserting their independence. They adopted the same name as the Hurufi, an approach of Persian Sufism which emerged in the late 14th–early 15th century. Art historian Sandra Dagher has described Hurufiyya as the most important movement to emerge in Arabic art in the 20th century.

== Definition ==
The term Hurufiyya is derived from the Arabic term huruf (حروف), the plural form of harf (حرف), which means 'letter'. When the term is used to describe a contemporary art movement, it explicitly references a medieval system of teaching involving political theology and Lettrism. In this theology, letters were seen as primordial signifiers and manipulators of the cosmos. Thus, the term is charged with Sufi intellectual and esoteric meaning.

The Hurufiyya art movement (also known as the Al-hurufiyyah movement or the Lettrism movement) refers to the use of calligraphy as a graphic element within an artwork, typically an abstract work. The pan-Arab hurufiyya art movement is distinct from the Letterist International, which had an Algerian section founded in Chlef in 1953 by Hadj Mohamed Dahou.

The term Hurufiyya has become somewhat controversial and has been rejected by some scholars, such as Wijdan Ali, Nada Shabout and Karen Dabrowska. An alternative term, al-madrassa al-khattiya fil-fann ('calligraphic school of art'), has been proposed to describe the experimental use of calligraphy in modern Arabic art.

== Brief history and philosophy ==
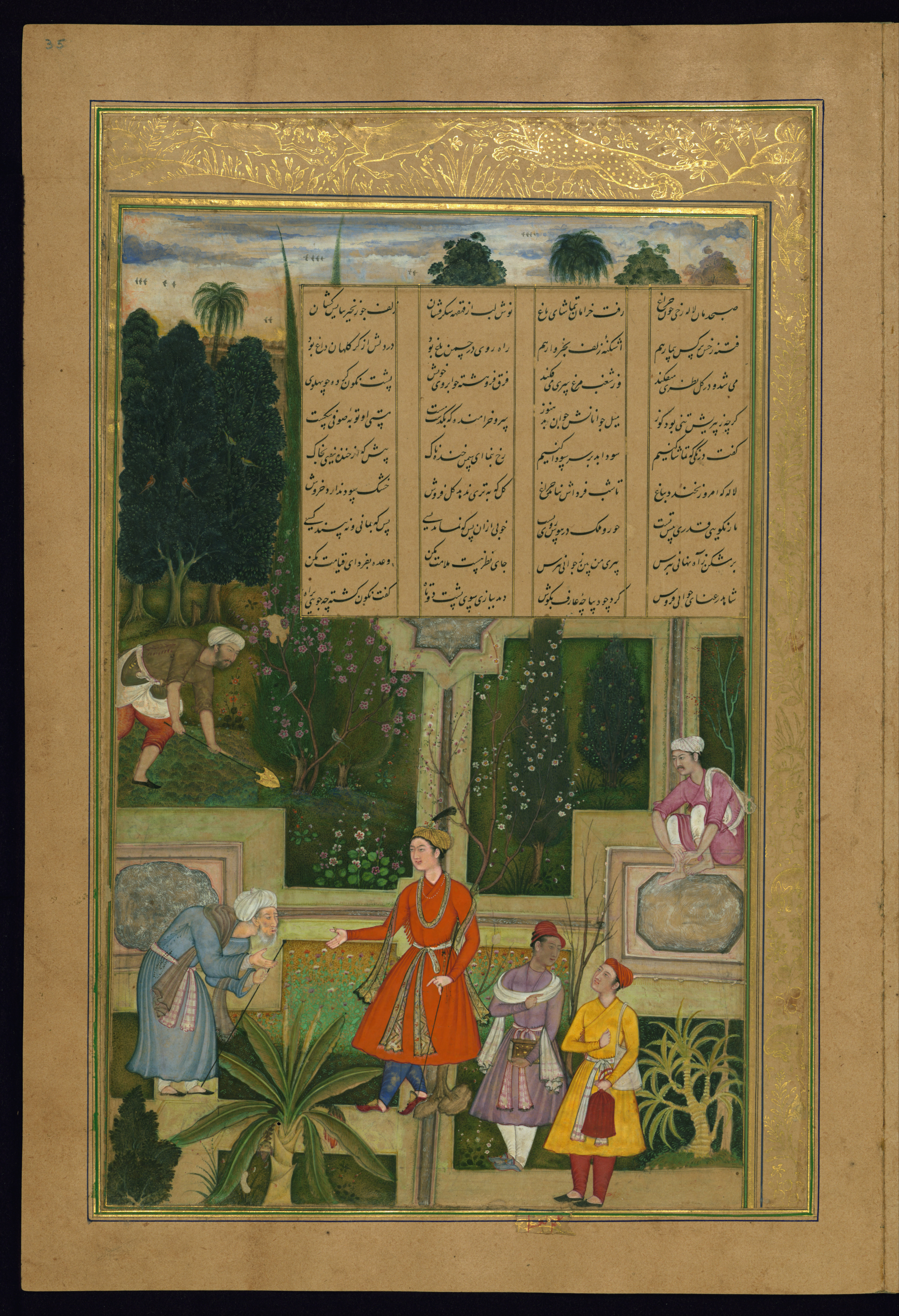
An Old Sufi Laments His Lost Youth, page from a Mughal manuscript, 16th century. Sufi art served as part of the inspiration for the al-hurufiyya movement.

Traditional calligraphic art was bound by strict rules, which, amongst other things, confined it to devotional works and prohibited the representation of humans in manuscripts. Practising calligraphers trained with a master for many years to learn both the technique and the rules governing calligraphy. Contemporary hurufiyya artists, however, broke free from these rules, allowing Arabic letters to be deconstructed, altered and included in abstract artworks.

The use of traditional Arabic elements, notably calligraphy, in modern art arose independently in various Islamic states; few of these artists working in this area had knowledge of each other, allowing for different manifestations of hurufiyya to develop in different regions. In Sudan, for instance, the movement was known as the Old Khartoum School, and assumed a distinctive character in which both African motifs and calligraphy were combined, while media such as leather and wood replaced canvas to provide a distinct African style. In Morocco, the movement was accompanied by the replacement of traditional media for oils; artists favoured traditional dyes such as henna, and embraced weaving, jewellery and tattoo as well as including traditional Amazigh motifs. In Jordan, it was generally known as the al-hurufiyyah movement, while in Iran, a similar approach was formed which was called the Saqqa-Khaneh movement.

Scholars have suggested that the hurufiyya art movement probably began in North Africa, in the area around Sudan, with the work of Ibrahim el-Salahi, who initially explored Coptic manuscripts, a step that led him to experiment with Arabic calligraphy. Madiha Omar was also a pioneer in the movement; active in the US and Baghdad from the mid-1940s. She was one of the first to explore the use of Arabic script in a contemporary art context in the 1940s and exhibited hurufiyya-inspired works in Washington in 1949. It is clear that by the early 1950s, a number of artists in different countries were experimenting with works based on calligraphy, including the Iraqi painter and sculptor, Jamil Hamoudi who experimented with the graphic possibilities of using Arabic characters, as early as 1947; Iranian painters, Nasser Assar (b. 1928) (fr:Nasser Assar) and Hossein Zenderoudi, who won a prize at the 1958 Paris Biennale.

Hurufiyya artists rejected Western art concepts, and instead grappled with a new artistic identity drawn from within their own culture and heritage. These artists successfully integrated Islamic visual traditions, especially calligraphy, into contemporary, indigenous compositions. The common theme amongst hurufiyya artists is that they all tapped into the beauty and mysticism of Arabic calligraphy, but used it in a modern, abstract sense. Although hurufiyya artists struggled to find their own individual dialogue with nationalism, they also worked towards a broader aesthetic that transcended national boundaries and represented an affiliation with an Arab identity in the post-colonial period.

The art historian, Christiane Treichl, explains how calligraphy is used in contemporary art:

"They deconstruct writing, exploit the letter and turn it into an indexical sign of calligraphy, tradition and cultural heritage. As the sign is purely aesthetic, and only linguistic in its cultural association, it opens hitherto untravelled avenues for interpretation, and attracts different audiences, yet still maintains a link to the respective artist's own culture... Hurufiyya artists do away with the signifying function of language. The characters become pure signs, and temporarily emptied of their referential meaning, they become available for new meanings."

The hurufiyya art movement was not confined to painters, but also included important ceramicists such as the Jordanian, Mahmoud Taha, who combined traditional aesthetics, including calligraphy, with skilled craftsmanship, and sculptors, such as the Qatari, Yousef Ahmad and the Iraqi sculptors, Jawad Saleem and Mohammed Ghani Hikmat. Nor, was the movement organised along formal lines across the Arab-speaking nations. In some Arab nations, hurufiyya artists formed formal groups or societies, such as Iraq's Al Bu'd al Wahad (or the One Dimension Group)" which published a manifesto, while in other nations artists working independently in the same city had no knowledge of each other.

Art historian, Dagher, has described hurufiyya as the most important movement to emerge in the Arab world in the 20th-century. However, the Cambridge Companion to Modern Arab Culture, while acknowledging its importance in terms of encouraging Arab nationalism, describes hurufiyya as neither "a movement nor a school."

=== Evolution of hurufiyya ===
Art historians have identified three generations of hurufiyya artists:

First generation: The pioneers, who were inspired by the independence of their nations, searched for a new aesthetic language that would allow them to express their nationalism. These artists rejected European techniques and media, turning to indigenous media and introducing Arabic calligraphy into their art. For this group of artists, Arabic letters are a central feature of the artwork. First generation artists include: the Jordanian artist, Princess Wijdan Ali, the Sudanese artist, Ibrahim el-Salahi; the Iraqi artists, Shakkir Hassan Al Sa'id, Jamil Hamoudi and Jawad Saleem; the Lebanese painter and poet, Etel Adnan and the Egyptian artist, Ramzi Moustafa (b. 1926).

Second generation: Artists, most of whom live in exile, but reference their traditions, culture and language in their artworks. The artist, Dia Azzawi is typical of this generation.

Third generation: Contemporary artists who have absorbed international aesthetics, and who employ Arabic and Persian script occasionally. They deconstruct the letters, and use them in a purely abstract and decorative manner. The work of Golnaz Fathi and Lalla Essaydi is representative of the third generation.

== Types of hurufiyya art ==
Hurufiyya art involved a very diverse range of "explorations into the abstract, graphic, and aesthetic properties of Arabic letters." Art historians, including Wijdan Ali and Shirbil Daghir, have attempted to develop a way of classifying different types of hurufiyya art. Ali identifies the following, which she describes as schools within the movement:

Calligraphy in sculptural works

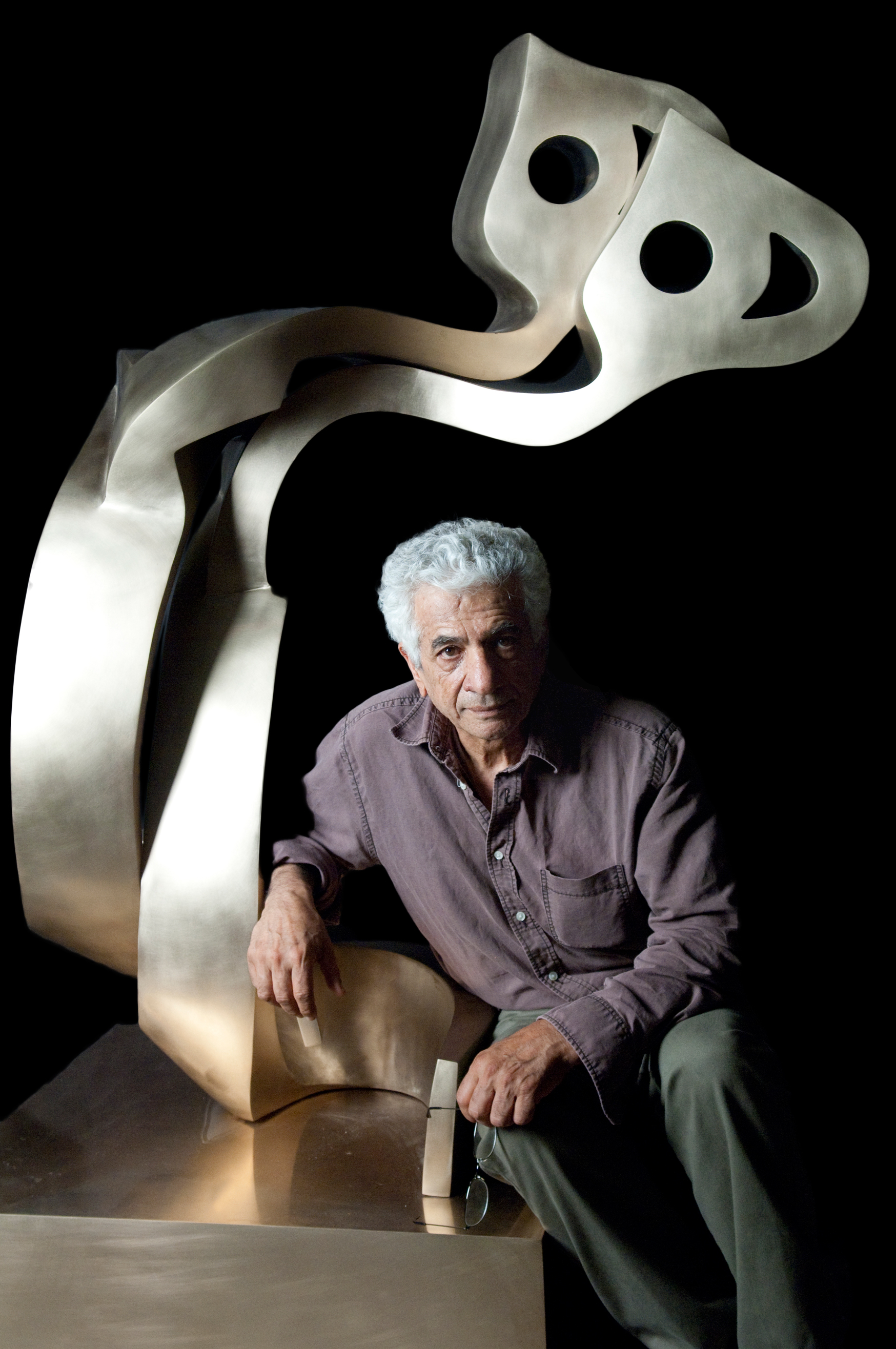
Parviz Tanavoli and his Lovers Heech

Parviz Tanavoli, the Iranian pioneer of modern and contemporary art, initiated the use of Persian calligraphy in modern and contemporary sculpting. His famous Heech sculptures have become iconic representations within Islamic art and the Persianate world. Additionally, Tanavoli incorporates pre-Islamic inscriptions and movable-type letters in his renowned Wall sculptures.
Pure calligraphy
Artworks in which calligraphy forms both the background and the foreground.
Neoclassical
Works that adhere to the rules of 13th-century calligraphy. An example of this is the work of Khairat Al-Saleh (b. 1940)

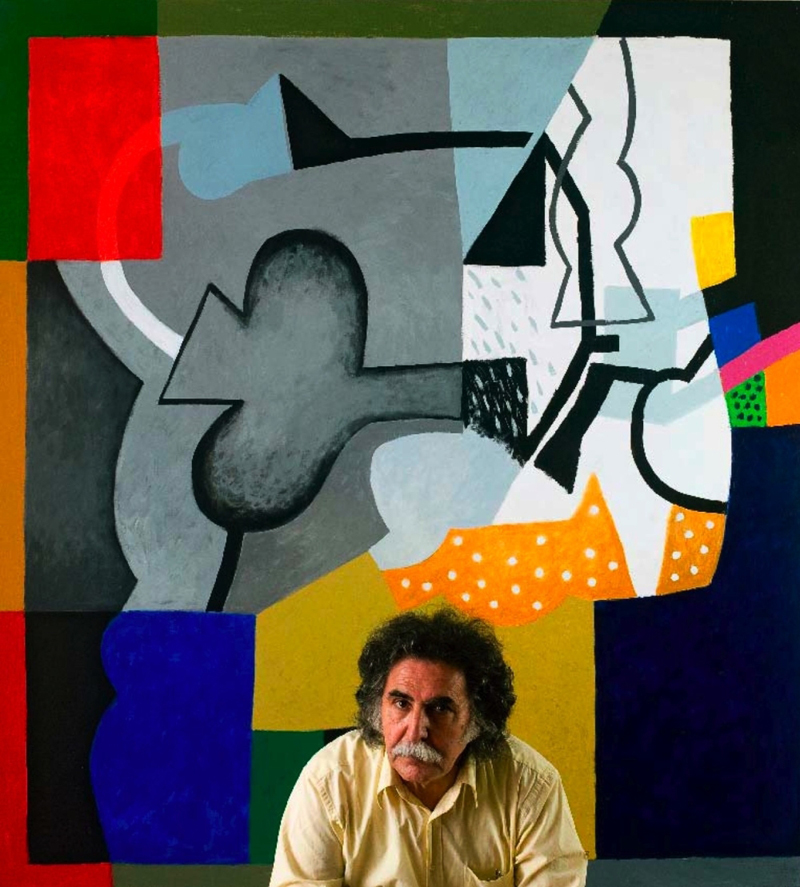
Artist, Dia-Al-Azzawi, exhibits the style of the Calligraphy Combinations School of Hurufiyya art

Modern classical
Works that blend pure calligraphy with other motifs, such as repeating geometric patterns. Ahmad Moustaffa (b. 1943) is representative of this style
Calligraffiti
Artwork, employing script, but which follows no rules and where artists require no formal training. Calligraffiti artists employ their own ordinary handwriting within a modern composition. Artists may reshape letters, or simply invent new letters that reference traditional Arabic scripts. Artists that belong to this school include: Lebanese painter and poet, Etel Adnan; Egyptian painter, Ramzi Moustafa (b. 1926) and the Iraqi artist and intellectual. Shakir Hassan Al Said.
Freeform calligraphy
Artworks that balance classical styles with calligraffiti.
Abstract calligraphy
Art that deconstructs letters and includes them as a graphic element in an abstract artwork. In this style of art, letters may be legible, illegible or may use pseudo-script. Rafa al-Naisiri (b. 1940) and Mahmoud Hammad (1923-1988) are notable examples of this style of artist.
Calligraphy combinations
Artworks that use any combination of calligraphy styles, often employing marginal calligraphy or unconscious calligraphy. Iraqi artist, Dia Azzawi is a representative of this style in the Arab modern art, and Hossein Zenderoudi is the most important example in Iranian modern and contemporary art.

== Examples ==
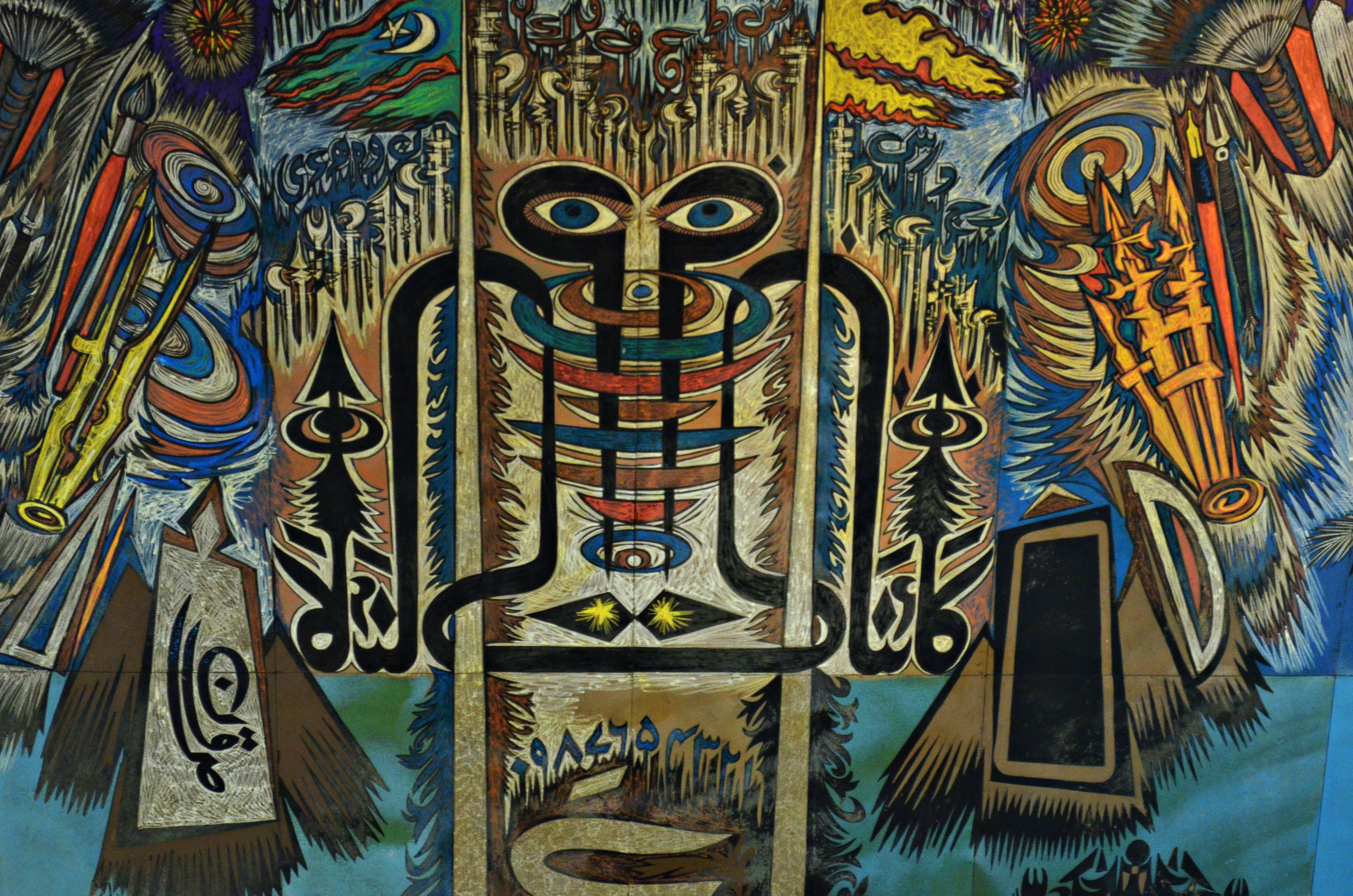
Roof of Frere Hall, Karachi, Pakistan, c. 1986. Pakmural by artist, Sadequain Naqqash, integrates calligraphy into a contemporary artwork

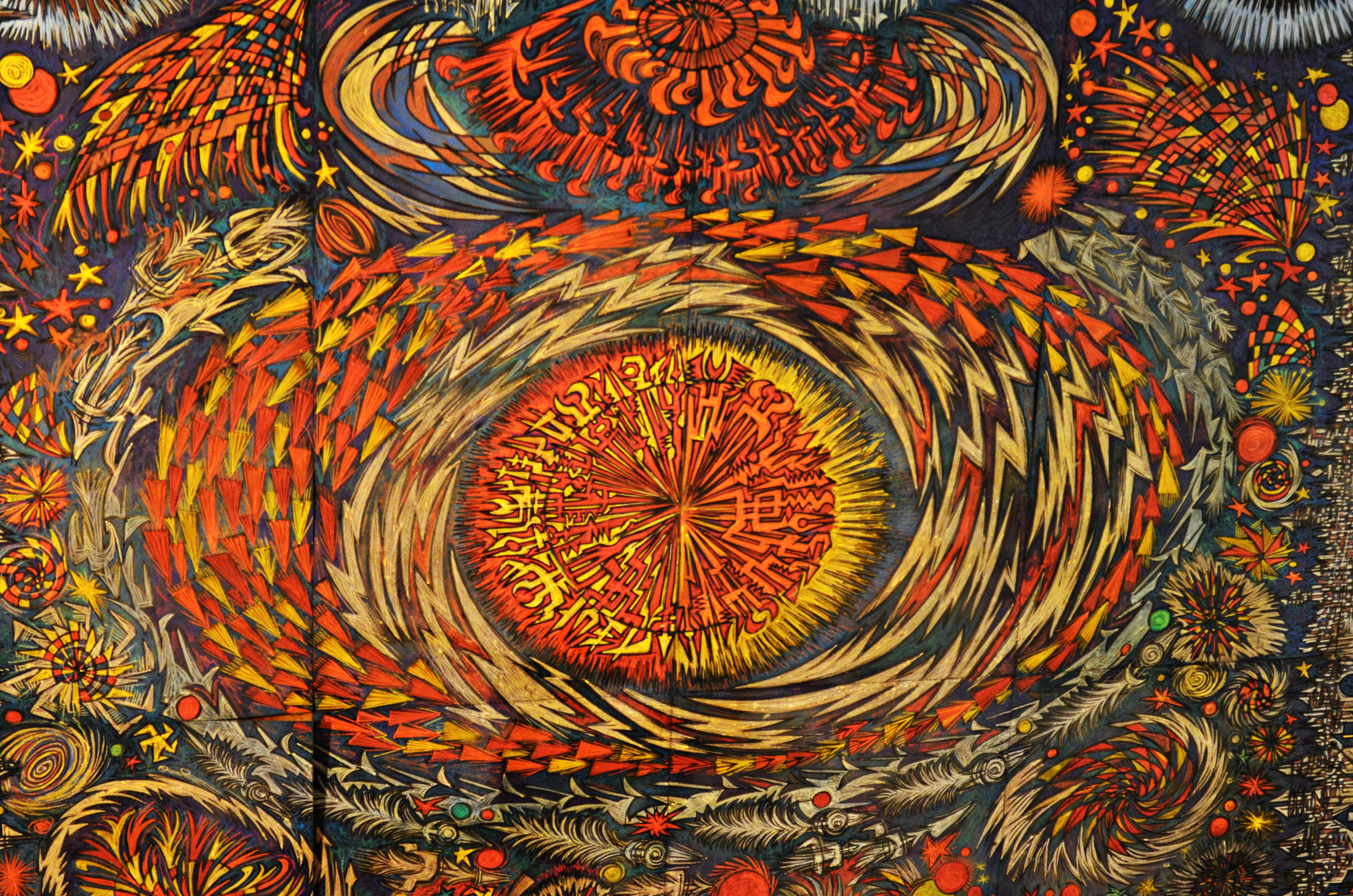
Roof of Frere Hall, Karachi, mural, c. 1986 by Sadequain Naqqash

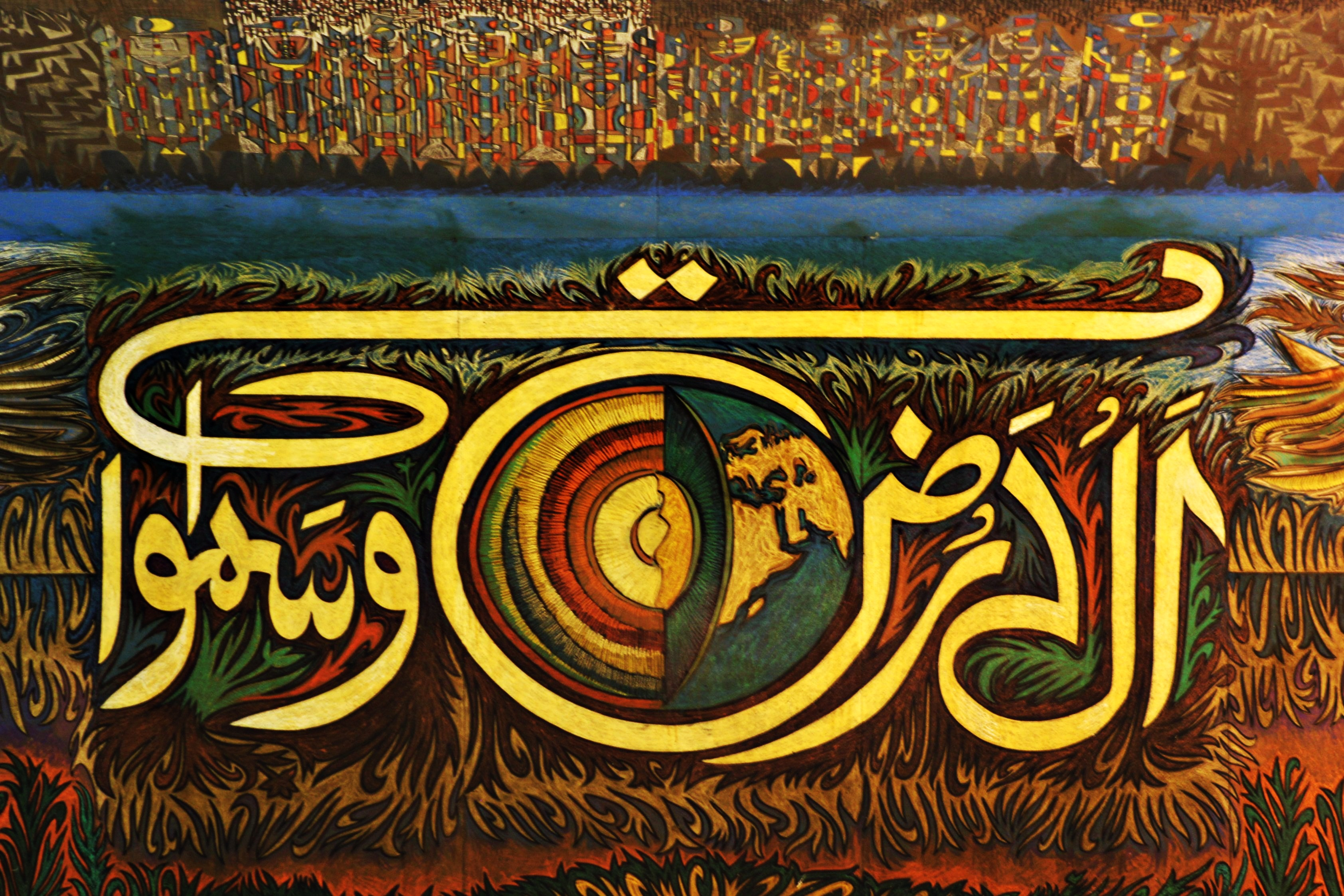
Detail from roof of Frere Hall by Sadequain Naqqash, illustrating Arabic letters

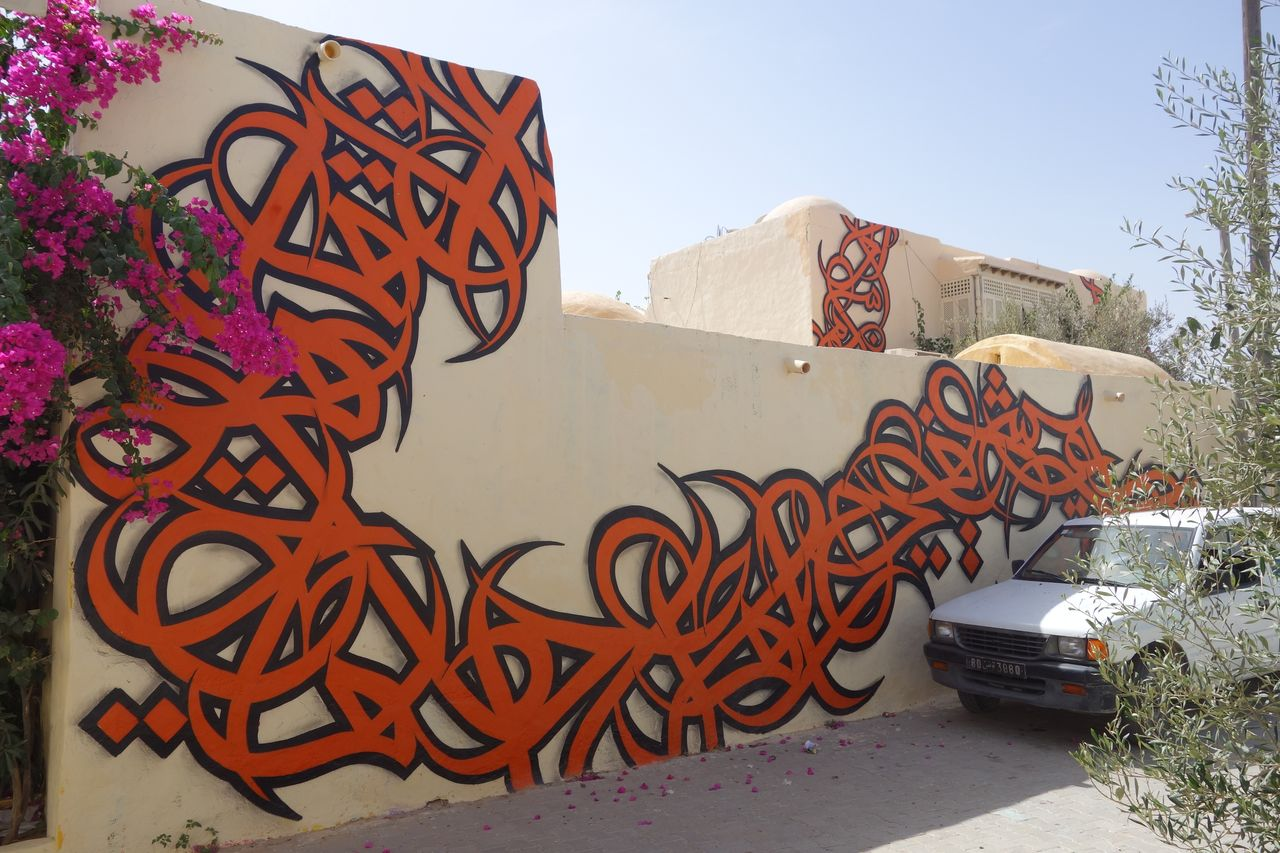
Art installation, Rue Djerba, Er Ryadh quarter, Tunisia, by el Seed, the calligraffiti artist

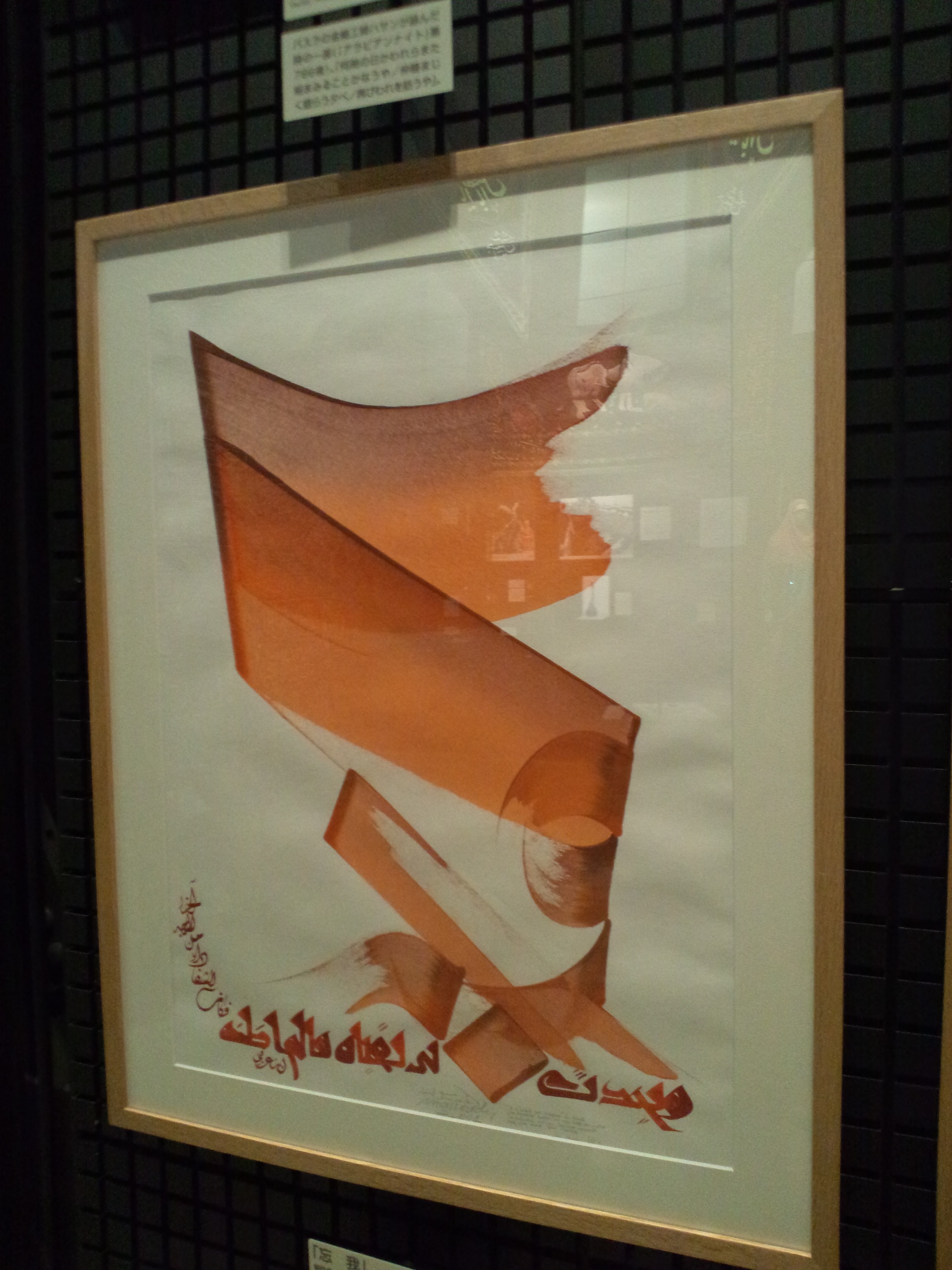
Al Wajd [Ectasy], painting by Hassan Massoudy, 2001. Now in the National Museum of Ethnology, Osaka

== Schools of Hurifiyya ==
- Saqqa-Khaneh school, Iran
- Khartoum School, Sudan
- One Dimension Group, Iraq

== Notable exponents ==
Iraqi painter, Madiha Omar, is recognised as a pioneer of the hurufiyya art movement, having exhibited a number of hurufist-inspired works in Georgetown in Washington as early as 1949. and publishing Arabic Calligraphy: An Inspiring Element in Abstract Art in 1950. Jamil Hamoudi was also a pioneer, active from the 1950s. Both Omar and Hamoudi joined the One Dimension Group when it was founded by Shakir Hassan Al Said in 1971 since its principles were based on the importance of the Arabic letter. The artist and art historian, Princess Wijdan Ali, who developed the traditions of Arabic calligraphy in a modern, abstract format and is considered a pioneer of the movement in Jordan, has been able to bring hurufiyya to the attention of a broader audience through her writing and her work as a curator and patron of the arts.

Notable exponents of hurufiyya art include:

Algeria

- Rachid Koraichi (b. 1947)
- Omar Racim (1894–1959)

Egypt

- Omar El-Nagdi (b. 1931)
- Ghada Amer (b. 1963) active in Egypt and France

Iraq

- Firyal Al-Adhamy (also known as Ferial al-Althami) (b. 1950)
- Shakkir Hassan Al Sa'id (1925–2004)
- Mohammed Ghani Hikmat (1929–2011)
- Madiha Omar (1908 – 2005)
- Jamil Hamoudi (1924–2003)
- Hassan Massoudy (b. 1944)
- Dia Azzawi (b. 1939) active in Iraq and London
- Saadi Al Kaabi (b 1937)
- Ismael Al Khaid (b. abt 1900)
- Rafa al-Nasiri (b. 1940)

Iran

- Nasser Assar (1928–2011)
- Nasrollah Afjei (b. 1933)
- Parviz Tanavoli (b. 1937)
- Faramarz Pilaram (1937–1983)
- Charles Hossein Zenderoudi (b. 1937)
- Sadegh Tabrizi (1938–2017)
- Behzad Golpayegani (1938–1985‌)
- Mohammad Ehsai (b. 1939)
- Reza Mafi (1943–1982)
- Golnaz Fathi (b. 1972)

Jordan

- Wijdan Ali (b. 1939) painter, art historian, curator and patron of the arts
- Mahmoud Taha (b. 1942) ceramicist

Kuwait

- Farah Behbehani (b. 1981)

Lebanon

- Etel Adnan (1925–2021) poet and visual artist
- Saloua Raouda Choucair (1916–2017)
- Samir Sayegh (b. 1945)

Morocco

- Lalla Essaydi (b. 1956)

Pakistan

- Sadequain Naqqash (1930–1987)

Palestine

- Kamal Boullata (1942–2019) active in Palestine

Saudi Arabia

- Ahmed Mater (b. 1979)
- Nasser Al Salem (b. 1984)
- Faisal Samra (b. 1955) multi-media visual and performing artist, active in Saudi Arabia and Bahrain

Sudan

- Ibrahim el-Salahi (b. 1930)
- Osman Waqialla (1924–2007)

Syria

- Mahmoud Hammad (b. 1923)
- Khaled Al-Saai (b. 1970) active in Syria and UAE

Tunisia

- Nja Mahdaoui (b. 1937)
- eL Seed (b. 1981) street artist/ calligraffiti artist

Qatar

- Yousef Ahmad (b. 1955) active in Doha, Qatar
- Ali Hassan Jaber (b.?) Qatar

United Arab Emirates

- Abdul Qadir al-Raes (b. 1951) active in Dubai
- Mohammed Mandi (b. abt 1950)

== Exhibitions ==
Individual hurufiyya artists began to stage exhibitions from the 1960s. In addition to solo exhibitions, several group exhibitions showcasing the variations in hurufiyya art, both geographically and temporally, have also been mounted by prestigious art museums.

- Word into Art: Artists of the Modern Middle East, 18 May- 26 September 2006, curated by Venetia Porter; the British Museum, London; travelling exhibition also at the Dubai Financial Centre, 7 February – 30 April 2008)
- Hurufiyya: Art & Identity, exhibition featuring selected artworks 1960s - early 2000s, curated by Karim Sultan; Barjeel Foundation, 30 November 2016 - 25 January 2017, Bibliotheca Alexandrina, Alexandria, Egypt

== See also ==
- Art movement
- Baghdad School - influential 13th-century school of calligraphy and illustration
- Calligraffiti
- Hurufism
- Iraqi art
- Islamic art
- Islamic calligraphy
- Jordanian art
- List of art movements
- Modern art
