= Ismail Fatah Al Turk =

Iraqi painter and sculptor

- Born: 1934; Basra, Iraq
- Died: 21 July 2004 (aged 69–70); Baghdad, Iraq
- Education: Baghdad Institute of Fine Arts; Accademia di Belle Arti di Roma
- Known for: Sculpture
- Notable work: Al-Shaheed Monument
- Spouse: Lisa Fattah (artist)

Ismail Fatah Al-Turk ("Ismail Fatah") (1934 or 1938–2004) was an Iraqi painter and sculptor born in Basra, Iraq, noted for his abstract art, monumental sculpture, and public works and as part of the Baghdad Modern Art Group, which fostered a sense of national identity. His monument, al-Shaheed Monument is the most iconic public monument in Baghdad.

== Life and career ==
Al-Turk was born in Basra in 1934. He graduated from the Baghdad Institute of Fine Arts in 1956 with a Bachelor of Painting and in 1958 with a Bachelor of Sculpture. and received a master's degree in fine art from the Accademia di Belle Arti di Roma in 1962. While in Rome, he also studied ceramics at San Giacomo.

He was very active in Baghdad's arts culture, joining a number of art groups including the Baghdad Modern Art Group (1957) and the al-Zawiya group, both groups were concerned with using art to reassert a sense of national identity by integrating Iraq's artistic heritage with international trends.

Fatah taught sculpture at the Baghdad Institute of Fine Arts and ceramics at the Academy of Fine Arts at the University of Baghdad. In 1986, he was the Chairman of the Iraqi Association of Plastic Arts.

Fatah executed a number of murals and sculptures for public display in Baghdad. Many of these pay homage to notable Iraqi poets, both current and historical; including bronze statues of Maaruf al-Risafi, an Iraqi nationalist poet active in the 1940s; the Abbasid poet Abu Nuwas and the Abbasid painter al-Wasiti. He held six exhibitions for sculpture and five exhibitions for paintings in Rome, Baghdad and Beirut. He was the winner of first prize for Arab artists in Italy.

The most well-known of his sculptures is the turquoise blue split dome of the Al-Shaheed Monument (Martyrs' Monument), in Palestine Street, Baghdad, and constructed between 1981 and 1983. Shaheed consists of a circular platform floating on top of an underground museum, and over which stands a split dome, 40 meters in height, clad in blue tile. He carried through all the design stages, along with a group of Iraqi architects, known as the Baghdad Architecture Group. The completed monument cost half a million dollars ($US). At its center are a twisted metal flag pole and a spring of water to symbolize the blood of the fallen. Its aim was to commemorate the Iraqi dead as a result of the Iran-Iraq war.

On the subject of the design for Shaheed, Al-Turk made the following comments:

"I insisted on having a large open space. Big monuments are originally from the East - the Pyramids, the Sphinx, the Obelisk, Minarets.. the earth there is flat, so these monuments can be seen from all directions. In the beginning, I had the idea of having a matyr bursting from the centre. But I did not like it, it was too theatrical. Then, the idea of life versus death began to form. The two pieces moving together towards martyrdom and fertility and the life stream. I moved the pieces until I got the interplay I wanted.

While living and working in United Arab Emirates, Fatah contracted cancer. He returned to Baghdad where he died 21 July 2004.

== Work ==
Fatah's most well-known work is al-Shaheed Monument (also known as the Martyrs Monument) built as a tribute to those who fell in battle defending Iraq during the Iran-Iraq war. The Art in America magazine rated Shaheed as the most beautiful design in the Middle East. However, he also produced paintings in oil such as Ashtar, a mixed media work on paper now in the Jordanian National Gallery of Fine Arts.

List of notable public works

- Ancient Arabic Medicine, Baghdad, Bronze and Marble, 8 × 2 metres, 1982
- Tigris and Euphrates, Haifa Street, Baghdad, 5 metres, 1982
- Two Figures, bronze sculpture, 360 X 180 cm, 1967
- Lawyer's Union Facade, 1967
- Abu Nuwas, sculpture, now in Abu Nuwas Street, Baghdad, 1972
- Monuments to Iraqi Poets - al-Waisati (National Arts Centre), 1972; al-Farabi (Zawra Park); Abu Nawas, Abou Nawas Street, 1972; Ma’arouf al-Rasfi, and al-Kazimi, al Kazimiya, Baghdad, 1973; (all in bronze)
- Al Shaheed Monument, (also known as the Matyrs Monument), 1981–1983 in Palestine Street, Baghdad
- Conference Palace, 1983
- The Guardian of the Fertile Crescent, 2001–2010, now in the Mathaf: Arab Museum of Modern Art in Doha, Qatar
- Maaruf al-Risafi (after the Iraqi poet of the same name) Al-Risafi roundabout, Baghdad

== See also ==
- Iraqi art
- Islamic art
- List of Iraqi artists
