= Institute of Fine Arts, University of Baghdad =

University of Baghdad Faculty of Fine Arts

The Institute of Fine Arts, formerly the Baghdad College of Fine Arts, is a faculty of the University of Baghdad.

== History ==
The origins of the institute can be traced back to the Baghdad Conservatory, founded in 1936 by Assyrian composer and scholar Hanna Petros.

Until the early 20th century there was little development in the visual arts. However, in the 1930s and 40s, a group of talented local artists was sent to study in Europe by the Ministry of Culture. On their return, these artists introduced modern styles such as impressionism to the local scene. They shared their experiences and knowledge of art by opening studios, providing art tuition, organising artists' collectives and exhibitions. Most of these artists taught in the modern style. They also consciously searched for a visual language that would integrate contemporary abstract art with Iraqi traditions and themes. These artists formed the nucleus of the group that founded the College of Fine Arts and became its first faculty members.

In 1940 the range of subjects studied was expanded to include acting, directing, painting, and sculpture. In the same year, the name was changed to the Institute of Fine Arts. Then in 1958 it became the Academy of Fine Arts and premises were found in Bab Al-Moatham near the Medical City Teaching Hospital. There was an expansion of courses available with a Department of Film and Theatre, and Department of Painting and Sculpture.

== Brief timeline ==
- 1936: Baghdad Conservatory established (precursor to the arts college)
- 1938: The College of Fine Arts established (with Faeq Hassan (1914-1992) as the Chair of the Department of Plastic Arts and Jawad Saleem (1919–1961) as Chair of the Department of Sculpture)
- 1940: Name changed to the Institute of Fine Arts (and offered programs in all aspects of the arts including acting, directing, painting and sculpture)
- 1955: The Department of Pottery and Ceramics was added
- 1961: The Academy of Fine Arts was founded, with Khalid al-Jadir (1922-1988) as its first Dean.
- 1967: The Institute was formally attached to the University of Baghdad
- 1974: The Department of Graphic Art was established in 1974, with Rafa al-Nasiri (1940-2013) as its Dean

== Notable alumni ==
- Suhail Dabbach, actor
- Jassim Zaini, artist
- Jamil Hamoudi, artist
- Mahmoud Taha, artist
- Aziz Amoura, artist

== See also ==
- Iraqi art
- List of Iraqi artists
