= Shakir Hassan Al Said =

Iraqi painter (1925–2004)

- شاكر حسن آل سعيد
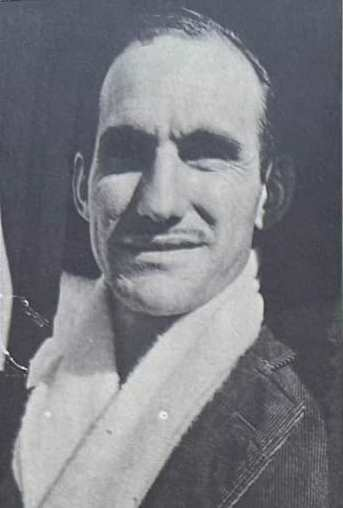
- Shakir Hassan Al Said 1962
- Born: 1925; Samawah
- Died: 2004 (aged 78–79)
- Education: B. Social Science, Higher Institute of Teachers, Baghdad (1948); Diploma in painting, Institute of Fine Arts, Baghdad (1954)
- Known for: Painter, sculptor, art historian, author and philosopher
- Style: Istilham al-turath
- Movement: Modern art; Hurufiyya movement, Saqqi Khanesh, Contemporary

Shakir Hassan Al Said (Arabic: شاكر حسن آل سعيد) (1925–2004), an Iraqi painter, sculptor and writer, is considered one of Iraq's most innovative and influential artists. An artist, philosopher, art critic and art historian, he was actively involved in the formation of two important art groups that influenced the direction of post-colonial art in Iraq. He, and the art groups in which he was involved, shaped the modern Iraqi art movement and bridged the gap between modernity and heritage. His theories charted a new Arabic art aesthetic which allowed for valuations of regional art through lenses that were uniquely Arabic rather than Western.

== Biography ==
Al Said was born in Samawah, Iraq; a rural area. He spent most of his adult life living and working in Baghdad. His rural upbringing was an important source of inspiration for his art and his philosophies. He wrote about his daily trek to school in the following terms:

"On my way from school, I used to see scores of faces, brown faces, painful and toiling faces. How close they were to my heart! They pressed me, and I passed them again and again. They suffered, and I felt their suffering. The peasants with their loose belts were pricked by thorns. They were so close to my heart!"

In 1948, he received a degree in social science from the Higher Institute of Teachers in Baghdad and in 1954, a diploma in painting from the Institute of Fine Arts in Baghdad where he was taught by Jawad Saleem. He continued his studies at the École nationale supérieure des Beaux-Arts in Paris until 1959, where he was taught by Raymond Legueult. During his stay in Paris, he discovered Western modern art in galleries and Sumerian art at the Louvre. After his return to Baghdad in 1959, Al Said studied the work of Yahya ibn Mahmud al-Wasiti, sufism and Mansur Al-Hallaj. He gradually abandoned figurative expressions and centered his compositions on Arabic calligraphy.

With Jawad Saleem, he co-founded Jama'et Baghdad lil Fann al-Hadith (The Baghdad Modern Art Group) in 1951; one of the most unusual arts movements in the Middle East in the post–World War II, that aimed to achieve an artistic approach both modern and embracing of tradition. This specific approach was called Istilham al-turath (Seeking inspiration from tradition), considered as "the basic point of departure, to achieve through modern styles, a cultural vision". These artists were inspired by the 13th-century Baghdad School and the work of calligraphers and illustrators such as Yahya Al-Wasiti who was active in Baghdad in the 1230s. They believed that the Mongol invasion of 1258 represented a "break in the chain of pictorial Iraqi art" and wanted to recover lost traditions. After the death of Saleem in 1961, al-Said headed the group.

Al Said wrote the manifesto for the Baghdad Modern Art Group and read it at the group's first exhibition in 1951. It was the first art manifesto to be published in Iraq. Scholars often consider this event to be the birth of the Iraqi modern art movement.

Al Said also wrote the manifesto for an art group he founded in 1971. After suffering from a spiritual crisis, the artist broke away from the Baghdad Modern Art group and formed the Al Bu'd al Wahad (or the One Dimension Group)", which was deeply infused with Al Said's theories about the place of art in nationalism. The objectives of the One Dimension Group were multi-dimensional and complex. At the most basic level, the group rejected two and three-dimensional artwork in favor of a single "inner dimension". The group was an assemblage of all the artists Al-Said knew who worked with Arabic Calligraphy, and as such the group focused on the exploration of different values of the Arabic script of graphic, plastic, linguistic, and symbolic works within modern art. In practice, a single inner dimension was difficult to manifest because most artworks are produced on two-dimensional surfaces. At a more profound level, "one dimension" refers to "eternity". Al Said explained: Despite only mounting only one exhibition,"The One-Dimension" group (in its creation and sustenance) was Shakir Hassan Al-Said's lasting contribution to contemporary art.

"From a philosophical point of view, the One-Dimension is eternity, or an extension of the past to the time before the existence of pictorial surface; to the non-surface. Our consciousness of the world is a relative presence. It is our self-existence while our absence is our eternal presence."

Al Said actively searched for relationships between time and space, and for a visual language that would connect Iraq's deep art traditions with modern art methods and materials. The incorporation of callij (calligraphy) letters into modern artworks was an important aspect of this. The letter became part of Al Said's transition from figurative art to abstract art. Arabic calligraphy was charged with intellectual and esoteric Sufi meaning, in that it was an explicit reference to a medieval theology where letters were seen as primordial signifiers and manipulators of the cosmos.

This group was part of a broader Islamic art movement that emerged independently across North Africa and parts of Asia in the 1950s and known as the hurufiyah art movement. Hurufiyah refers to the attempt by artists to combine traditional art forms, notably calligraphy as a graphic element within a contemporary artwork. Hurufiyah artists rejected Western art concepts, and instead searched for a new visual languages that reflected their own culture and heritage. These artists successfully transformed calligraphy into a modern aesthetic, which was both contemporary and indigenous.

Al Said, used his writing, lectures and his involvement in various art groups to shape the direction of the modern Iraqi art movement and bridged the gap between modernity and heritage. In so doing, Al Said "charted a new Arabo-Islamic art aesthetic, and thus initiated a possible alternative for art valuating for local and regional art other than those allowed through an exclusionary Western canon of art history."

== Work ==
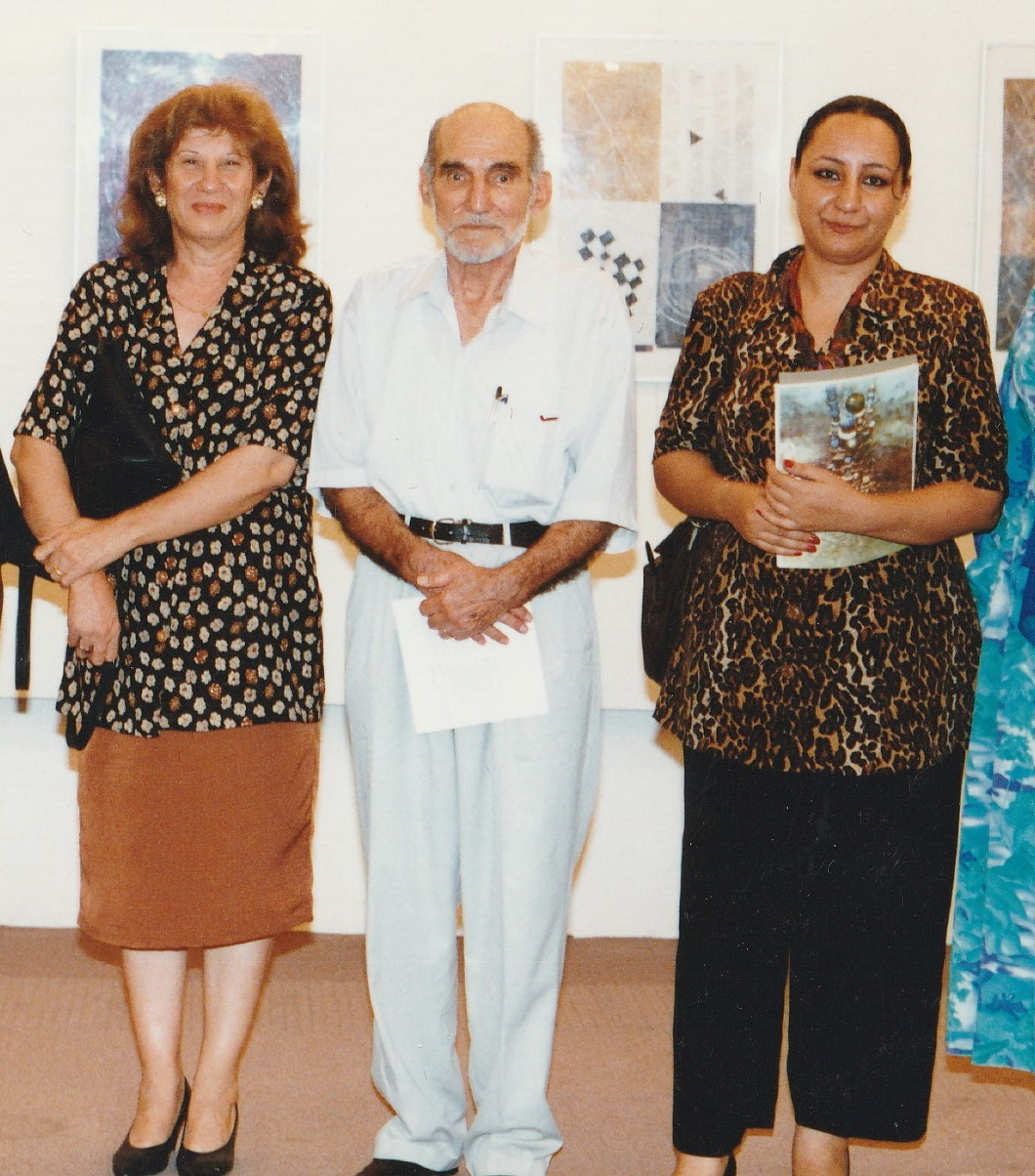
Shakir Hassan Al Said at Saddam Art Center, Baghdad, 1999, Iraq.

Al Said's early work reveals the influence of European avant-garde art movements - particularly expressionism and cubism. However, his work also drew on his Arabic-Islamic heritage and popular culture. His work evolved from the 1960s after he began to focus on Sufism in the 1960s. From this time, he began to integrate Arabic letters as a visual element in his compositions. His artistic philosophy was rooted within both Sufism (a branch of Islam) and Western Modern ideals regarding structuralism, semiotics, deconstructionist, phenomenology, and existentialist thoughts. Iraqi negotiations of modernist and post-modernist conditions are exemplified thoroughly throughout his work and artistic approach. While his focus on the Arabic script and power of Calligraphy became focused and driven following the founding of "The One-Dimension" group, he chartered a unique contemporary aesthetic embodying the pairing of Arab styles and Islamic focus.

Calligraphy is of vital importance in Arabic art because letters were charged with Sufi intellectual and esoteric meaning. Letters were seen as primordial signifiers and manipulators of the cosmos. However, traditional calligraphic work was bound by strict rules, which amongst other things, confined calligraphy to devotional works. Al Said and his followers were responsible for setting calligraphy free from its traditional confines, and using it in modern abstract artworks. His fascination with line and its relationship with space and time is closely intertwined with his interest in Arabic words and calligraphy. Thus, around the 1960s, Al Said gradually abandoned figurative expression and used Arabic letters as a center point for his compositions. In this, his transition from figurative to abstraction centered on letters and words and how they can be woven into contemporary art.

Al Said published several books on modern art in Iraq and numerous articles in Arabic journals and newspapers. He is recognized as one of the fathers of modern art in Iraq. His influence as an artist, a teacher, and a forerunner of modern art.

His work is collected by major museums, such as Mathaf: Arab Museum of Modern Art in Doha, the Guggenheim in New York, Sharjah Art Museum and Darat al Funun - The Khalid Shoman Foundation.

Select list of paintings

- Cubist Cockerel, Oil on board (53 x 56 cm), 1955
- Window to the Word || Hurrufiyya, Mixed media on cardboard laid onto canvas (125 x 125 cm), 1966
- Coffee Corner, (64 x 76 cm), 1967
- The Envious Shall Not Prevail || Al Hasud la yasud, Acrylic on wood (84.5 x 123 cm), 1979, Private Collection
- Objective Contemplations, oil on canvas, 120 X 120 cm, 1984
- Ta'imlat Mowdou'i, (Meditations), date unknown
- Wall Strip no. 4, Mixed media on wood, 22 X 122 cm, 1992 (now in the Jordan National Gallery)

Select list of publications

Sole-authored

- Dirāsāt taʼammulīyah, [Conceptual Studies], Baghdād, al-Muʼassasah al-ʻĀmmah lil-Ṣaḥāfah wa-al-Ṭibāʻah, 1969(in Arabic)
- Al-Bayaanaat l-Fanniyyah fil Iraq, [Art Manifestos in Iraq], Baghdad, Ministry of Culture and Information, 1973 (in Arabic)
- Fuṣūl min taʼrīkh al-ḥarakah al-tashkīlīyah fī al-ʻIrāq, [History of the plastic movement in Iraq], Baghdād, al-Jumhūrīyah al-ʻIrāqīyah, Wizārat al-Thaqāfah wa-al-Iʻlām, Dāʼirat al-Shuʼūn al-Thaqāfīyah wa-al-Nashr, (1983) 1988 (in Arabic)
- al-Ḥarb wa-al-salām, Baghdād, al-ʻIrāq: Dār al-Shuʼūn al-Thaqāfīyah al-ʻĀmmah "Āfāq ʻArabīyah", 1986 (in Arabic)
- al-Uṣūl al-ḥaḍārīyah wa-al-jamālīyah lil-khaṭṭ al-ʻArabī, [The Cultural and Aesthetic origins of Arabic Calligraphy], Baghdād, Wizārat al-Thaqāfah wa-al-Iʻlām, Dār al-Shuʼūn al-Thaqāfīyah al-ʻĀmmah Āfāq ʻArabīyah", 1988 (in Arabic)
- Jewad Selim: al-Fannan wa al-'Akharun, [Jewad Selim: The Artist and the Others], Baghdad, ad-Dar al-'Ammah li-sh-Shu'un th-Thaqafiyyah, Ministry of Culture, 1991 (in Arabic)
- Al Fann t-Tashkeelee al-Iraqi al-Mu'aser, [Contemporary Iraqi Plastic Art], Tunis, The Arab League Educational, Cultural and Scientific Organization (ALECSO), 1992
- Maqālāt fī al-tanẓīr wa-al-naqd al-fannī, [Articles in Endoscopy and Art Criticism], Baghdād, al-Jumhūrīyah al-ʻIrāqīyah, Wizārat al-Thaqāfah wa-al-Iʻlām, Dār al-Shuʼūn al-Thaqāfīyah wa-al-Nashr, 1994
- al-Ḥurrīyah fī al-fann: wa-dirāsāt ukhrʹa, [Freedom in Art: Other Studies], Bayrūt, al-Muʼassasah al-ʻArabīyah lil-Dirāsāt wa-al-Nashr, 1994 (in Arabic)
- ''Dialogue in Plastic Arts, Amman, Darat Al Funoon, 1995 (in Arabic)
- Ana n-Noqtah Fawqa fa'i l-Harf, [I am the point above fa' of letter], Baghdad, 1998 (in Arabic)
- Diraasaat Ta'ammuliyyah, [Contemplative studies], Beirut, Dar al-Jamal, 2006 (in Arabic)

Collaborative works

- Mohammad Al-Kasmi; Shākir Ḥasan Āl Saʻīd; Amer Al-Ubaidi; Mohammad Mahredin Azim and Aved Badar, Contemporary Arab Artists, Part One, London, Iraqi Cultural Centre Gallery, 1978 (in English)
- Francis Alÿs; Jewad Selim; Shākir Ḥasan Āl Saʻīd, Sadik Kwaish Alfraiji and Sherko Abbas, Archaic: the Pavilion of Iraq, 57th International Art Exhibition, La Bienale di Venezia, Milan, Mousse Publishing, 2017 (in English)
- Ben Bella, Jean Degottex, Brion Gysin, Shakir Hassan Al-Said and Lee U-Fan, Croisement de Signes, Paris, Institut du monde arabe, 1989 (in French)
- Shākir Ḥasan Āl Saʻīd and Majed Saleh as-Samaraa'i, Hiwar al-Fann t-Tashkeeli: Muhadaraat wa Nadawaat hawla Jawaneb mina th-Thaqaafah at-Tashkeeliyyah wa 'Alaqatuhaa bil Funun al-Arabiyyah wal-'Islamiyyah, [Dialogue of the Plastic Art: Lectures and Seminars on Aspects of the Plastic Culture and its Relationship with the Arabic and Islamic Arts], Amman, Darat Al Funun, Abdul Hameed Shoman Foundation, 1995 (in Arabic)

== See also ==
- Iraqi art
- Islamic art
- Islamic calligraphy
- List of Iraqi artists
