= Statue of Abu Ja'far al-Mansur =

Monument to the founder of Baghdad, Iraq

- تمثال أبي جعفر المنصور
- Location: Baghdad, Iraq
- Designer: Khaled al-Rahal
- Type: Statue
- Height: 2.0 metres (6.5 ft)
- Completion date: January 1977
- Restored date: June 2008
- Dedicated to: Abbasid Caliph al-Mansur

The Statue of Abu Ja'far al-Mansur (Arabic: تمثال أبي جعفر المنصور) is a bronze statue of the second Abbasid Caliph Abu Ja'far al-Mansur who was also the founder and builder of Baghdad which he made the capital of the Caliphate. The statue is located on the Karkh side, in the Mansour district of Baghdad.

The Statue is a bronze sculpture of the face of the Abbasid Caliph, mounted on a brick body that forms a small building decorated with Islamic decoration. The statue is located on a small rounded square decorated with trees and herbs.

== History ==
The statue was sculpted by the Iraqi sculptor Khaled al-Rahal, one of the most prominent pioneers of the modern Iraqi artistic movement. It was unveiled on January 6, 1977, by Mayor of the capital, Ibrahim Muhammad Ismail, on the occasion of the celebration of the fifty-sixth anniversary of the founding of the Iraqi army during the reign of Ahmed Hassan al-Bakr.

=== Modern History ===
During the US invasion of Iraq, an unidentified gunmen blew up the statue on October 18, 2005. Almost two years after it was blown up, the Baghdad Municipality announced that they will restore the statue in its Baghdadi architectural style.

== Controversy ==
Due to al-Mansur's poisoning of Ja'far al-Sadiq, the sixth of the 12 imams revered by the Twelver Shi'ism, and some inherited accounts that remember al-Mansur as a tyrant who brutalized the Shi'a sect, many Shi'a extremists have called for the removal and demolition of the statue, inspired by the American and British activists who destroyed statues of Confederate soldiers and slave traders in the eighteenth century. Tired of the sectarian divisions, youth groups from the Shi'a holy city of Najaf defended the statue as "a symbol of Iraqi heritage".

Shi'a extremist groups and members believed to be backed by Iran have also used Twitter in order to spread the campaign using trends which caused the statue to be heavily guarded by Law enforcement forces. On June 12, 2021, Iraqi security forces prevented an attempt to destroy the statue by a group of people armed with axes and hammers.

== See also ==
- Iraqi art
