= Grand Festivities Square =

Ceremonial square in Baghdad, Iraq

Coordinates: 33°18′20.46″N 44°22′58.80″E

Grand Festivals Square
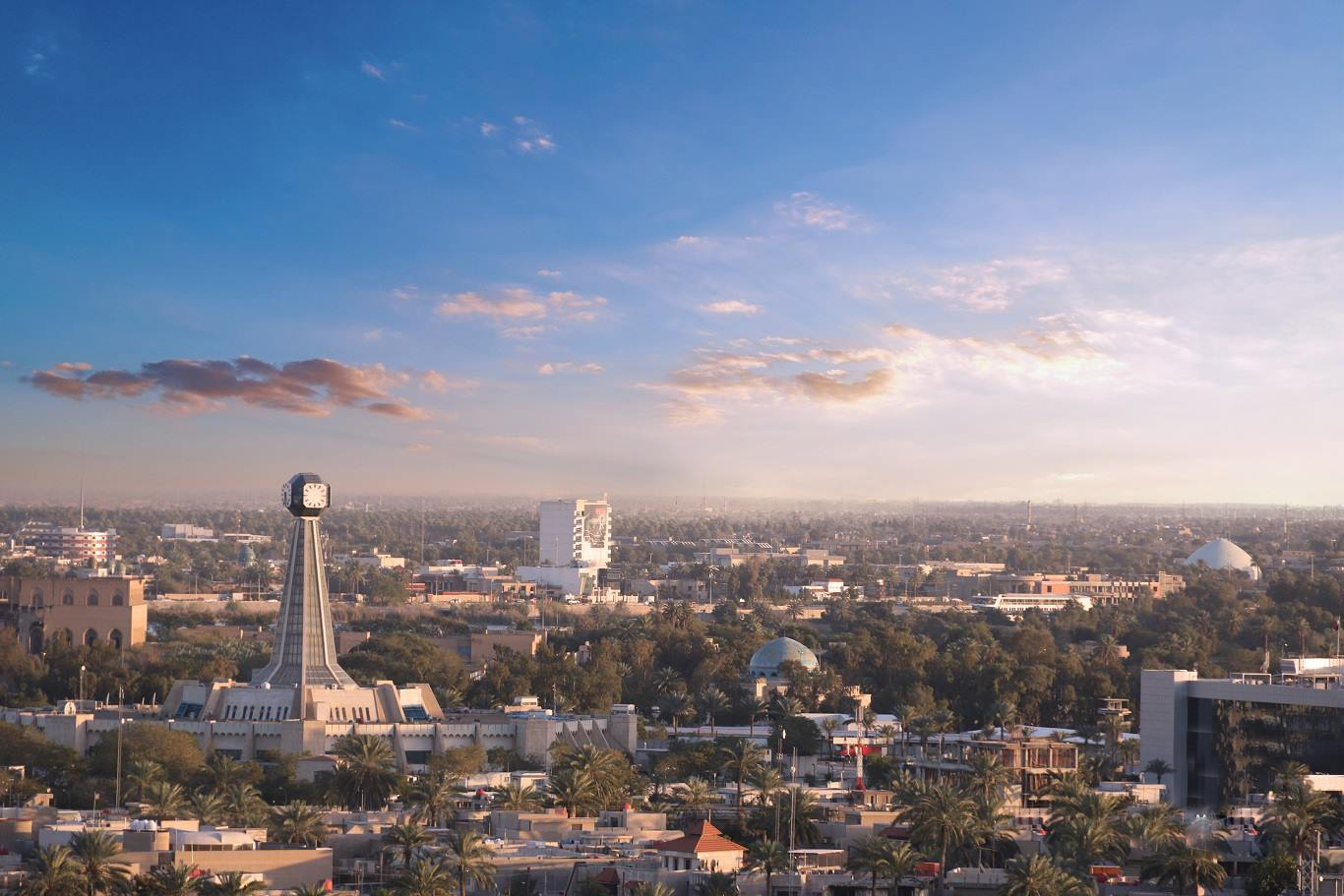
- Interactive map of Grand Festivals Square
- Native name: Arabic: ساحة الاحتفالات الكبرى
- Part of: Green Zone
- Location: Baghdad, Iraq

Other
- Known for: Military parades; Cultural activities; Festivals; Victory Arch
- Status: Restored

Great Celebrations square (Arabic: ساحة الاحتفالات الكبرى, romanized: Sahat al-Ahtifalat al-Kubra) is the main square for public celebrations in Baghdad, Iraq. It includes a stadium for the heads of the state. It's located in the center of the Parade avenue, and it holds three important public monuments created by leading mid-20th century sculptors.

== Description ==
In 1986 (two years before the end of the Iran-Iraq war) the Iraqi Ba'athist government began construction of a festival and parade ground in al-Zawra'a Park, near the extensive presidential complex in the center of Baghdad. The square is located near al-Harthiya and in the fortified Green Zone, and the site was specifically selected for its symbolic value. Iraqis generally believe it is the same location where the Muslim Arabs defeated the Persians in 636 CE and this historic event is seen to be the beginning of Islamic domination of the region. The site was intended to become the place where military parades and national events would be held. Known as Grand Festivities Square, it comprised a large parade ground, an extensive review pavilion and a large reflecting pool. The surrounding grassy areas hosted Iraqis during military parades. Adding to the festive appeal of the grounds were three refreshments booths that sold ice cream, cold beverages, and candy.

The then leader of Iraq, Saddam Hussein commissioned three major public artworks for the area. These artworks were to be memorials to Iraq's fallen soldiers, a remembrance of Iraq's pain and suffering as a consequence of the Iran-Iraq war and symbols of Iraq's victory in the war. The Monument to the Unknown Soldier, based on a concept by Iraqi sculptor, Khaled al-Rahal, and situated just beyond the perimeter of the square, had already opened in 1982. Hussein commissioned another monument and a major work, the Victory Arches, another concept by the sculptor, Khaled al-Rahal, to be built in the same vicinity and it was inaugurated in 1989.

The Victory Arches mark the entrances to the square. On the day the arches were dedicated (8 August, 1989), Saddam rode under the arches astride a white horse. It is generally acknowledged that Hussein intended to cast an allusion to the slain Islamic martyr Hussein, killed in Karbala in 680 CE, whose death caused the rift between Shi'a and Sunni Muslims. The monument, although presenting a triumphalist narrative in relation to the Iran-Iraq war, has assumed a broader symbolism and represents those Iraqis who fell in any war throughout the country's history.

The three monuments in the vicinity of the square form a visual and symbolic unit. The construction of the three artworks was part of a broader Ba'athist government program to beautify Baghdad, install a sense of national pride, and at the same time immortalize Saddam Hussein's reputation as a powerful leader.

Unknown Soldier's Monument, Zawra Park, Baghdad

== Recent developments ==
In 2007, the new Iraqi government wanted to demolish the Victory Arch monuments and the decision was approved by former Prime Minister Nuri al-Maliki, however, this decision drew strong backlash from protestors. Al-Maliki's approval was challenged by US Ambassador Zalmay Khalilzad, who blocked the demolition on 21 February. The monument was then restored by the government in 2011 as a sign of reconciliation. The Square has become a place for public demonstrations and protests. In April–May, 2016, following a protracted political struggle between to end sectarianism in politics, a large crowd gathered at Grand Festivities Square in a non-violent protest.

In June 2023, the Grand Festivals Square has been reopened after a 20 year closure. Al-Mansour Cinema, al-Mansour Theater and the Fine Art Hall, which were cultural locations in the square before it was closed in 2003, were rehabilitated and opened to the public. Over time, the square attracted a more artistic legacy. The restoration of the square was in hopes of returning of the cultural role that Baghdad used to play in the past, specifically before 2003. The square will be the main hosting spot for festivals and artistic activities. It is also hoped that newer Iraqi generations would be familiar with the cultural aspects of the area. Al-Mansour Cinema was given to the Iraqi Cinema Company, a company established in 2011 to organize cinemas in the country. The cinema includes one hall and hundreds of seats. The Fine Art Hall includes hundreds of artistic works, including plastic art.

== See also ==
- Baghdad's sights and monuments
- Culture of Iraq
- Iraqi art
- The Monument to the Unknown Soldier
- Victory Arch
- Al-Shaheed Monument
