= Military Trophy Park (Baku) =

Park of Armenian trophies in Azerbaijan

Coordinates: 40°22′35″N 49°52′23″E

Military Trophy Park Hərbi Qənimətlər Parkı
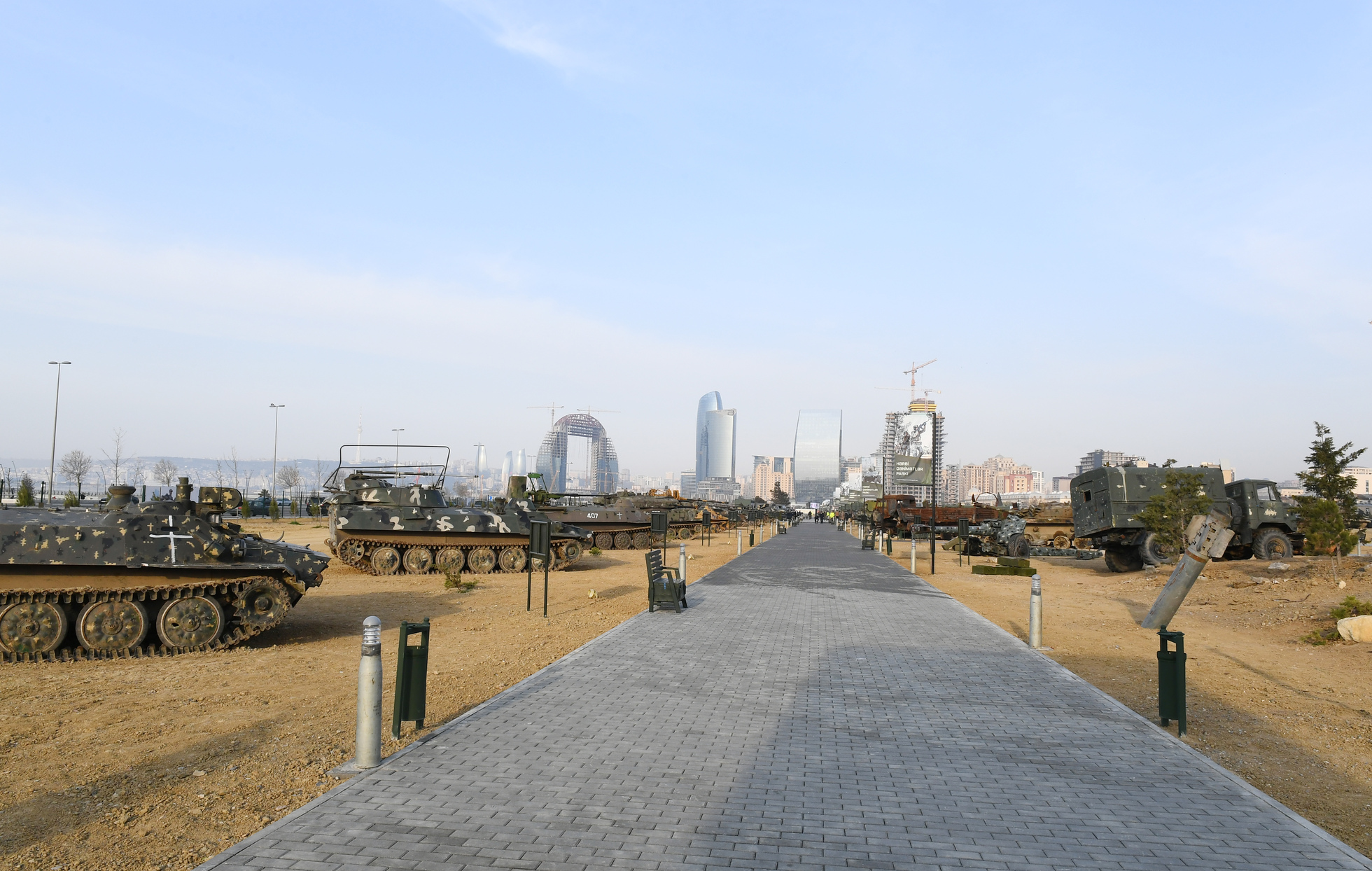
- Interactive map of Military Trophy Park; Hərbi Qənimətlər Parkı
- Type: Military
- Location: 8 November Avenue, Baku, Azerbaijan
- Created: April 12, 2021
- Public transit: Shah Ismail Khatai metro station
- Website: http://herbiqenimetlerparki.az/

The Military Trophy Park (Azerbaijani: Hərbi Qənimətlər Parkı), also referred to as War Trophies Park is a public park in Baku, the capital of Azerbaijan, containing war trophies seized by the Azerbaijani Armed Forces from the Armenian Army and the Artsakh Defence Army during the 2020 Nagorno-Karabakh war.

News of the park led to widespread condemnation in Armenia due to its display of helmets of dead Armenian soldiers and wax mannequins of Armenian troops. The Armenian government accused its Azerbaijani counterpart of publicly humiliating the memory of those killed in the war, with Armenia's ombudsman calling it a "clear manifestation of fascism". Several international journalists called the park "barbaric", and international observers also criticized the park. The Council of Europe's Commissioner for Human Rights, Dunja Mijatović, expressed concerns over the inauguration of the park and its display of "dehumanising scenes".

The Azerbaijani Ministry of Foreign Affairs, on the other hand, stated that "this practice exists in military museums in many countries of the world" and that "Azerbaijan has every right to perpetuate its victory through parades, parks, etc". The wax figures and the helmets were removed from main display in October 2021, though a couple of helmets were left in the trenches. The employees of the park were cited saying that the models and helmets had been sent for repairs, but that it was not clear when they would be returned. Armenia's representative at ICJ Yeghishe Kirakosyan emphasized this was done in the period after Armenia filed the lawsuit at the ICJ, adding that Armenia was still demanding the full closure of the park.

== Background ==
Large-scale hostilities between the Azerbaijani Armed Forces and the armed formations of the unrecognized Artsakh Republic and Armenia, began on 27 September 2020, lasted 44 days and became the longest and bloodiest war in the region since 1994. On 9 November 2020, the leaders of Azerbaijan, Armenia and Russia signed a ceasefire agreement. Armenian side was defeated. Azerbaijan regained seven regions around Nagorno-Karabakh and about a third of the territory of the former Nagorno-Karabakh Autonomous Oblast of the Azerbaijan SSR.

== Opening ==
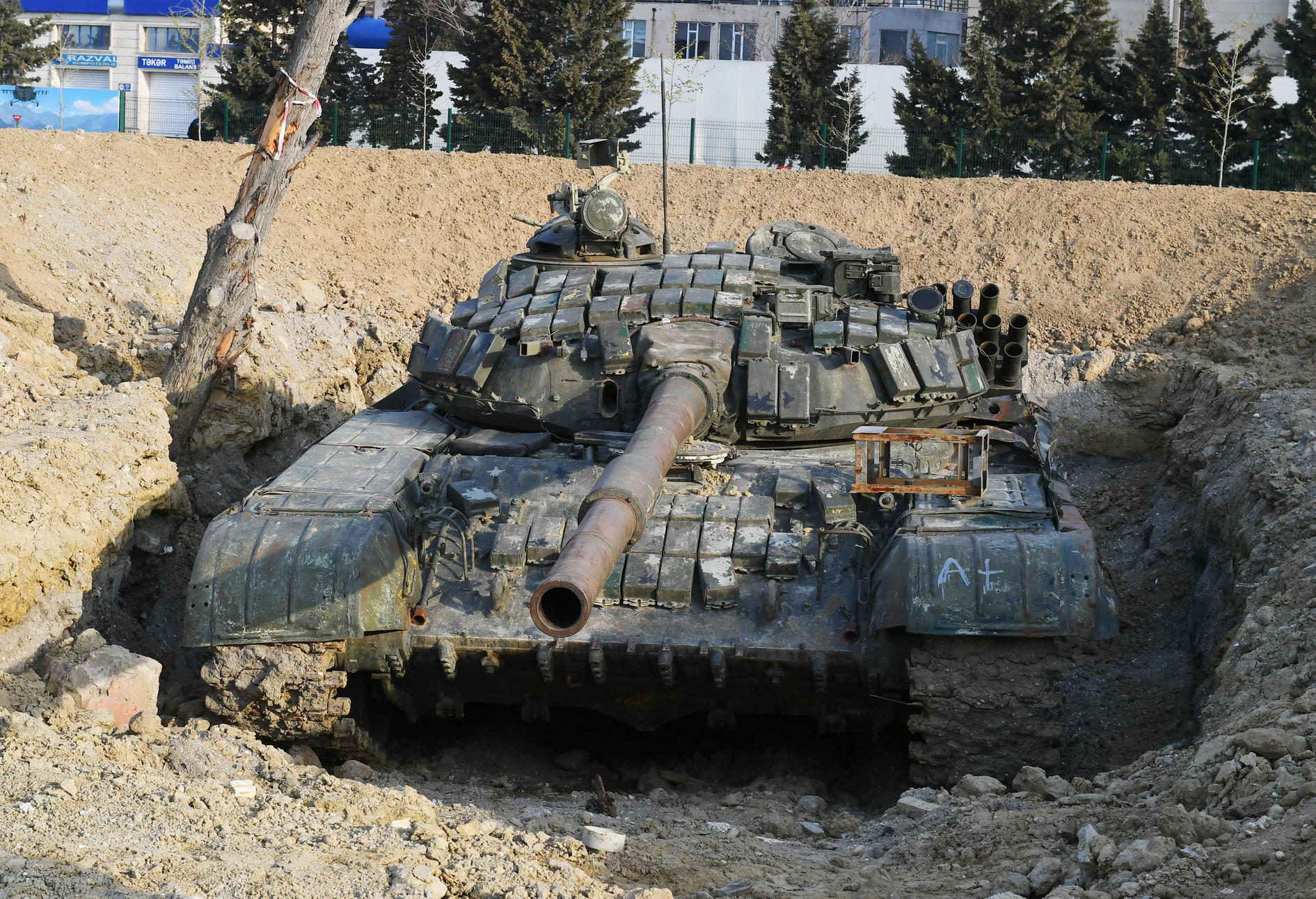
Captured T-72B in the park

The park itself was established in January 2021. Information that the Azerbaijani authorities would open a park filled with war trophies obtained during the last conflict in Nagorno-Karabakh in Baku appeared in February 2021. It was reported that construction work was underway on the territory, and some military equipment had already been brought to the site. Some of the equipment were demonstrated at the Victory Parade in Baku on 10 December. The creation of the entire exposition took about three months. The park was opened on 12 April 2021. President of Azerbaijan Ilham Aliyev attended the opening ceremony of the park.

On 13 April, Baku hosted an international conference entitled "A New Outlook at the South Caucasus: Post-Conflict Development and Cooperation”, after which, 27 guests from 15 countries visited the newly opened park. A day later, it became open to the public.

== Exhibit ==
The park displays mock-ups of the defense system, and more than 300 exhibits, including up to 150 pieces of heavy equipment. Among the exhibits are tanks, combat vehicles, artillery installations, anti-aircraft missile systems, small arms, and vehicles. In particular, the park includes T-72 tanks, lightly armored MT-LB tractors, 9K33 Osa and 2K12 Kub anti-aircraft missile systems. The park also displays fragments of missiles from Russia's 9K720 Iskander operational-tactical missile systems (OTRK) found in Nagorno-Karabakh, according to the Azerbaijan National Agency for Mine Action (ANAMA).

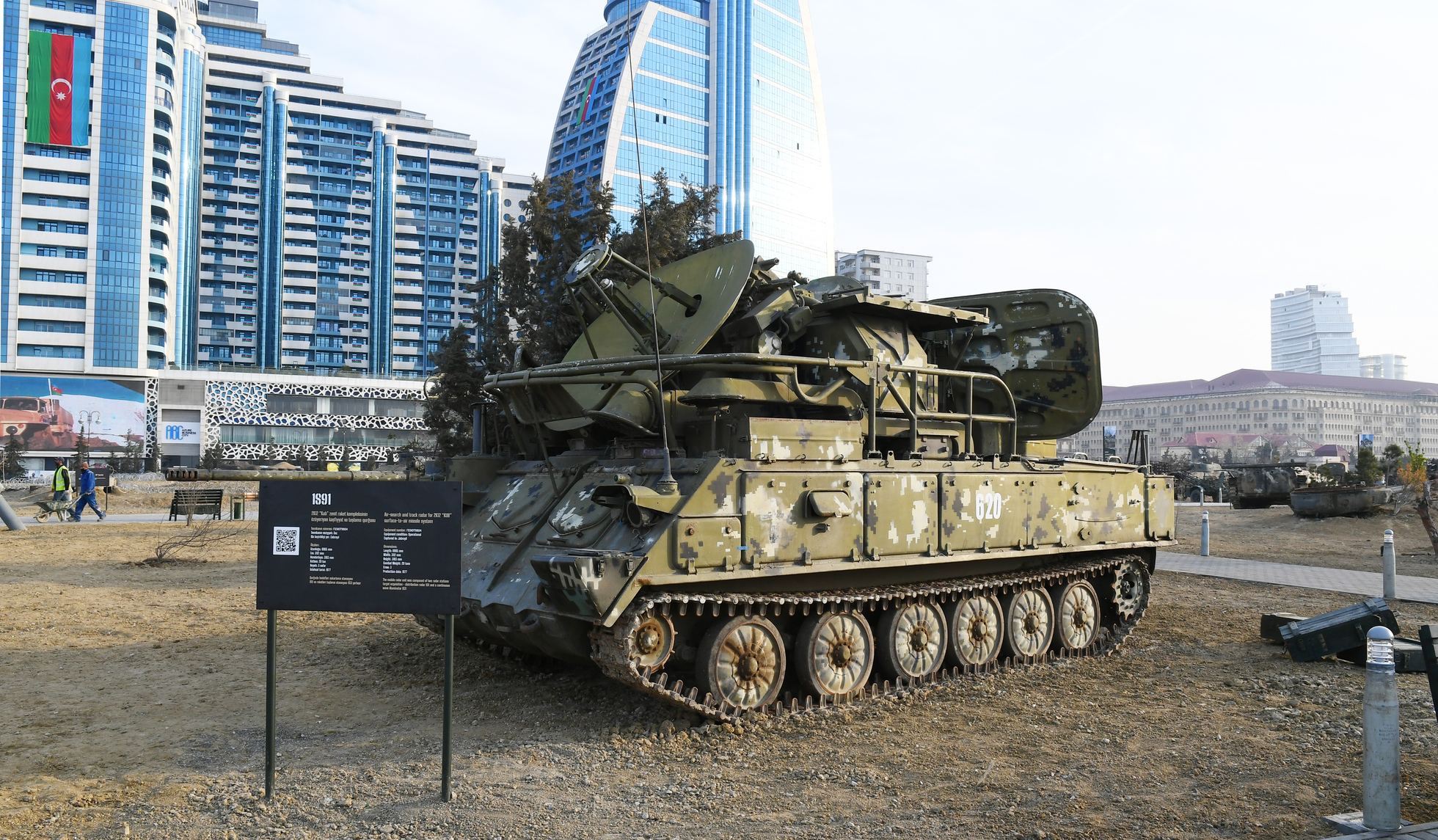
Captured 1S91 on display

The park also purports to recreate the Armenian defence network in Karabakh, which consisted of 10 lines, including concrete engineering structures, anti-tank trenches and hedgehogs, mined areas, tunnels, trenches, etc. The park, among other things, displayed hundreds of helmets taken from dead Armenian troops, as well as wax dummies of the Armenian military. The helmets belong to dead Armenian soldiers, but Azerbaijani authorities claimed that they were left behind by retreating Armenian soldiers.

The wax figures and the helmets were removed from main display in October 2021, though a couple of helmets were left in the trenches. The employees of the park were cited saying that the models and helmets had been sent for repairs, but that it was not clear when they would be returned. Armenia's representative at ICJ Yeghishe Kirakosyan emphasized this was done in the period after Armenia filed the lawsuit at the ICJ, adding that Armenia was still demanding the full closure of the park.

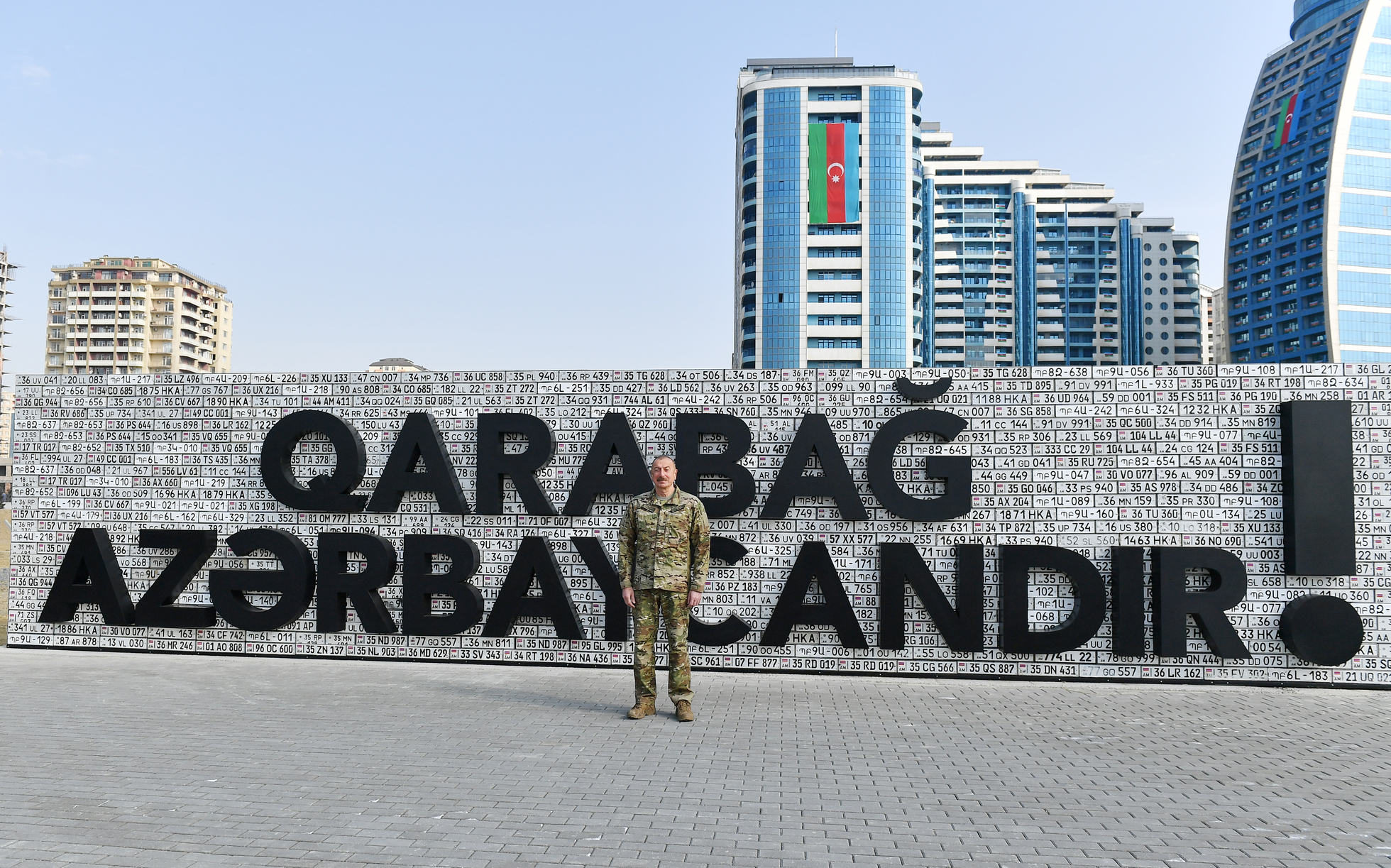
The "Karabakh is Azerbaijan!" plaque

At the entrance to the park is a large plaque which was displayed at the parade with more than 2,000 Armenian licence plates, with the panel having the inscription "Karabakh is Azerbaijan!".

=== Creation of wax figures ===
Ankara-based journalist Javid Agha wrote that the wax figures of Armenian military personnel were deliberately designed to show them as "ugly and cowardly".

The mannequins of the exhibit were made to be as ugly as possible, based on the sculptors' own imagining of Armenians, using sharp-hooked noses and abnormal skull shapes.

In an interview with Azvision.az, Kamran Asadov, one of the three sculptors of the wax mannequins of Armenian soldiers on display at the park, said he and the other sculptors used "aquiline (hooked) nose forms," with "skull bases absent" in crafting the mannequins.

Another sculptor, Rəşid Məhərrəmov, told in an interview with the journal Xəzər Xəbər, that before making the models he researched images "typical of Armenians" and adopted his mannequins to these images. He added that similar museums are built in such parks in "most countries of the world" which depict the military of the defeated side and that these depictions may not necessarily resemble real people.

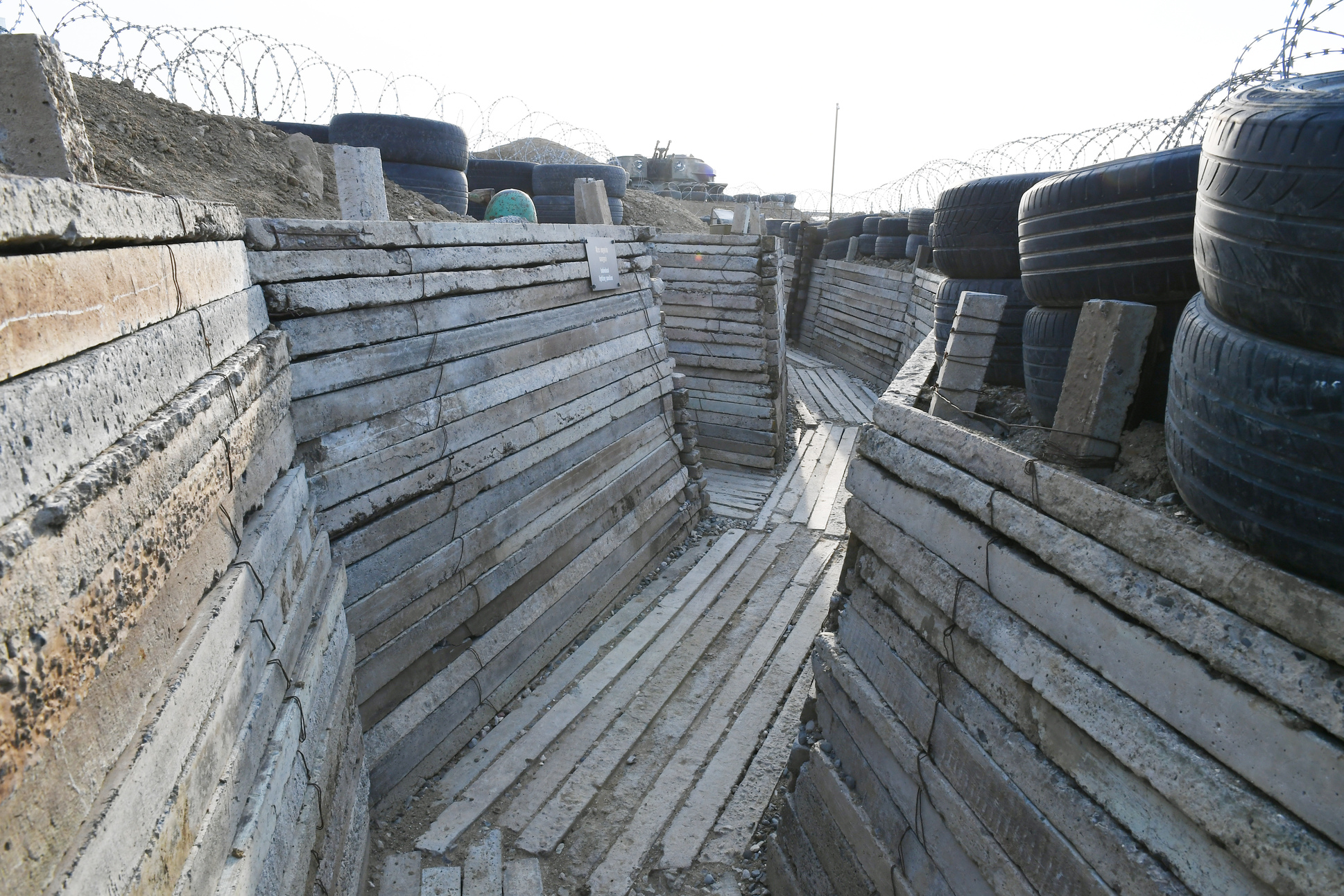
Trenches recreated at the park

== Reactions ==
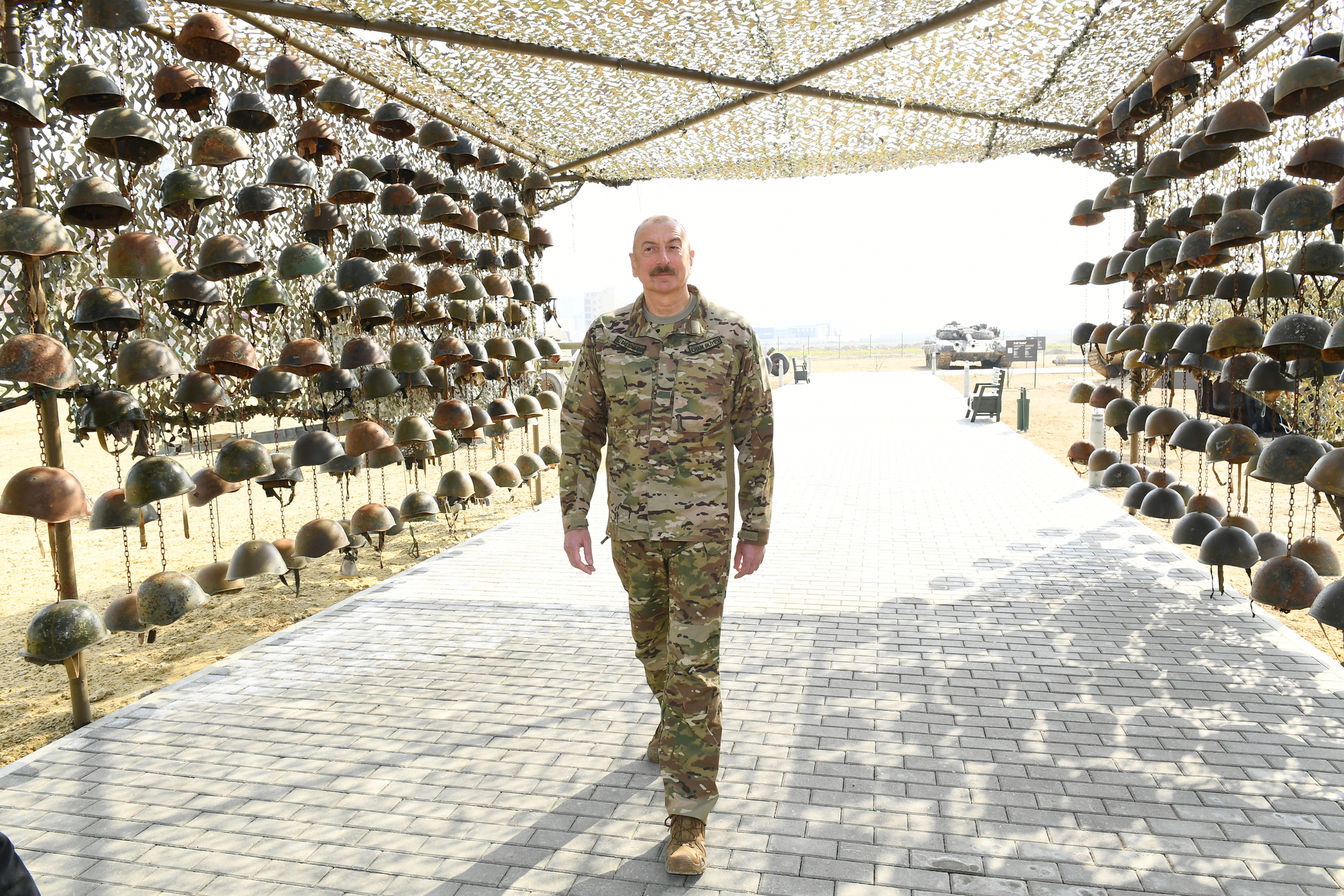
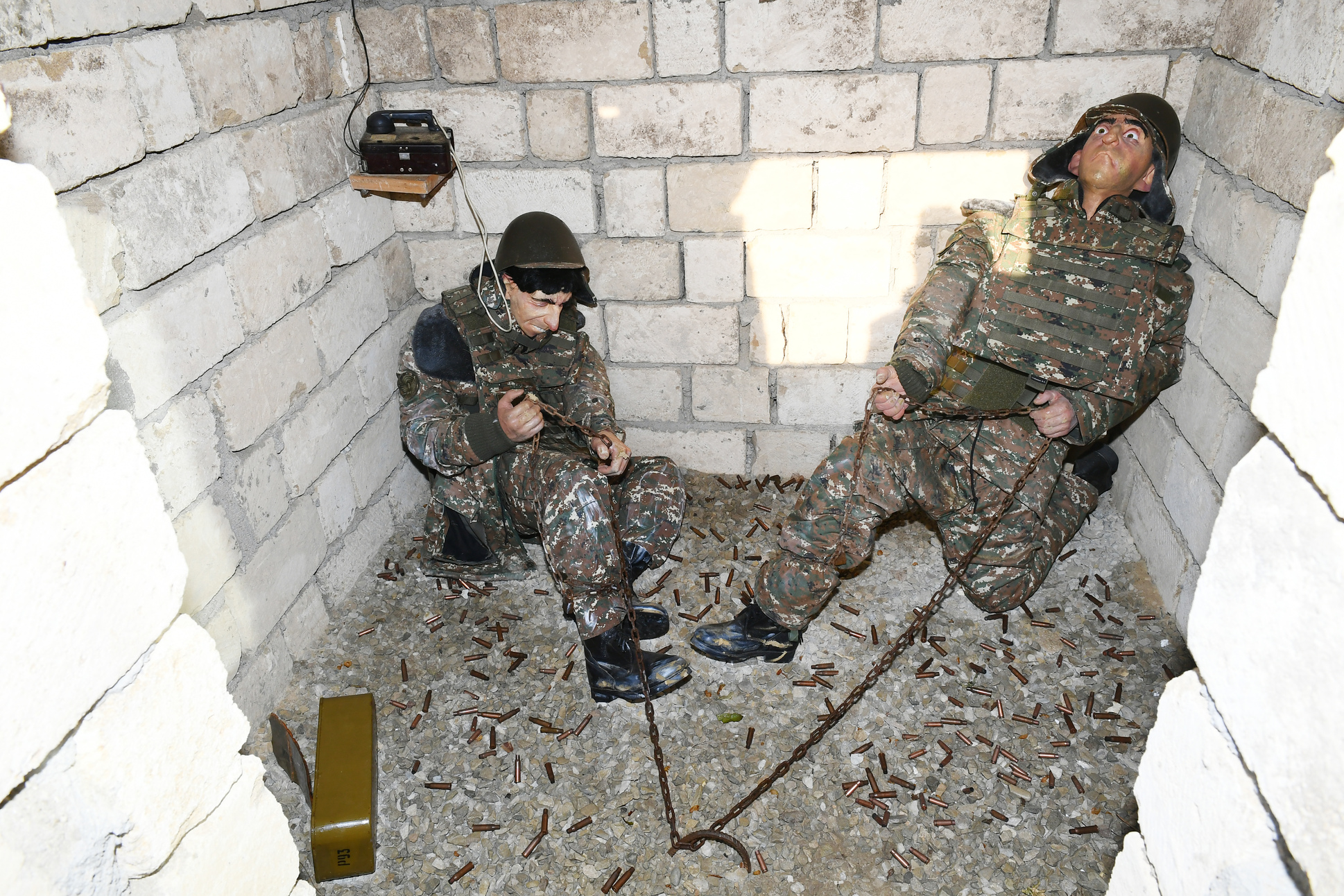
The display of the helmets of Armenian troops and wax mannequins of Armenian soldiers sparked uproar in Armenia. President Ilham Aliyev shown in the first image during a visit to the park.

=== Azerbaijan ===
==== Government ====
The Ministry of Foreign Affairs of Azerbaijan, in response to the statement of the Ministry of Foreign Affairs of Armenia's response to the opening of the park, stated that Azerbaijan has every right "to perpetuate" its victory through parades, parks, etc. Referring to the demonstration in the park of wax mannequins of Armenian soldiers who participated in the war, the Ministry stated that "this practice exists in military museums in many countries of the world." Member of the parliamentary Committee on Human Rights Zahid Oruj said that he saw nothing wrong with showcasing the trophies, and referred to military history museums found in others countries in the world.

==== Opposition ====
Opposition activist Bahruz Samadov argued that the park dehumanizes Armenians and "reflects the logic of exclusion that has dominated in Azerbaijan for decades: The enemy, internal or external, must be eliminated."

Azerbaijani historian Dr Altay Goyushov, one of the leaders of the opposition Republican Alternative Party (REAL), criticized the helmets corridor, and was subsequently criticized by local journalists and bloggers who justified demonstrating the helmets, considering it "widespread practice in war museums around the world", one of them going as far as inviting "all who do not feel well looking at them to go and drown in the Caspian Sea".

==== Other ====
Some Azerbaijani social media users criticised the park, most notably the mannequins and helmets on display. Nevertheless, many people in Azerbaijan expressed admiration for the park's exhibits.

Azerbaijani political scientist Zardusht Alizadeh said that the helmets and wax mannequins of the soldiers do not refer to the peaceful Armenian residents of Azerbaijan, but rather to "the invaders who illegally entered the territory of Azerbaijan, destroyed and killed." At the same time, he noted that after the victory "these techniques could be left in the past, they are unnecessary and counterproductive."

=== Armenia ===
The Ministry of Foreign Affairs of Armenia accused Azerbaijan of "dishonoring the memory of victims of the war, missing persons and prisoners of war and violating the rights and dignity of their families". According to the Armenian Foreign Ministry, the display of wax mannequins of Armenian soldiers, their personal belongings and helmets contradicts "Azerbaijan's statement on the post-conflict situation, regional peace and reconciliation." The Ombudsman of Armenia Arman Tatoyan made a similar statement calling it a "clear manifestation of fascism." Addressing the park's opening during a meeting with an EU representative, Prime Minister Nikol Pashinyan said that "Azerbaijan's policy of Armenophobia must be condemned by the civilized world".

The park was mentioned by Armenian opposition politicians Edmon Marukyan and Naira Zohrabyan during their speeches at the Parliamentary Assembly of the Council of Europe (PACE), with Zohrabyan showing the members of the assembly an image of an Azerbaijani child choking the wax mannequin of an Armenian soldier at the park.

=== European organisations ===
In a letter to Azerbaijani president Ilham Aliyev, the Council of Europe Commissioner for Human Rights, Dunja Mijatović, expressed concerns over the inauguration of the park, the display of "dehumanising scenes" and wax mannequins "depicting dead and dying Armenians soldiers." She said she considered such images "highly disturbing and humiliating," and promoted long-standing hostile sentiments, hate speech, and manifestations of intolerance. The commissioner called on Aliyev to provide his support for promoting peace and reconciliation between the Armenians and Azerbaijanis.

On 20 May 2021, the European Parliament adopted a resolution, which condemned the park as "a glorification of violence and risks inciting further hostile sentiment, hate speech or even inhumane treatment of remaining POWs and other Armenian captive civilians, thereby perpetuating the atmosphere of hatred and contradicting any official statements on reconciliation" and urged that it be closed without delay.

On 23 June 2021, the Dutch Parliament adopted a resolution condemning, among other things, the park in Baku: “Given that the ceasefire agreement and international law of war have been violated after the 40-day war in Nagorno Karabakh in 2020, that more than 200 Armenian prisoners of war are still being held in Azerbaijan, among other places also in Baku, and that there is also a "Trophy park" in Baku with, among other things, the helmets of fallen Armenians, in view of the political-military situation in Azerbaijan, calls on the government not to send a delegation to Baku if the Dutch national team comes to play there”.

=== Others ===
John Marshall Evans, a former US ambassador to Armenia, called the park "Racist, degrading, indeed, redolent of genocidal intent." Greek Member of the European Parliament Nikos Androulakis criticised the opening of the park, saying in a post on social media that it “insults the memory of the Armenian soldiers” and is a “monument to barbarism.” Lithuanian foreign minister Gabrielius Landsbergis said the "it is not normal to witness" a war trophy park in the 21st century: "Disrespect toward any victim is unacceptable, and no violence should be glorified." Finnish Member and European Parliament Heidi Hautala criticised the opening of the park in a post on social media: “This theme park in Azerbaijan is beyond disgusting. Primary school-age kids on the opening day exposed to such warmongering.”

Thomas de Waal, a long-time commentator on the Karabakh conflict, noted that the sculptures of Armenian soldiers resemble "hook-nosed" and greedy" stereotypes that echoed anti-Semitic tropes. Scottish journalist Alex Massie reacted to the park with a John Buchan quote on civilisation and barbarism: ”You think that a wall as solid as the earth separates civilisation from barbarism. I tell you the division is a thread, a sheet of glass. A touch here, a push there, and you bring back the reign of Saturn.“. British journalist Jake Hanrahan called the park "hideous" and "barbaric" and argued that it is "essentially a war crimes theme park." Turkish commentator, vice-president of Novo Nordisk pharmaceutical company Nazim Can Okar opined that it is "barbaric" and "indefensible." American Journalist Lindsey Snell called the park a "Genocide Park" and stated that "If a society’s children are indoctrinated from birth, the cycle of hatred will never end" German political scientist and human rights activist Düzen Tekkal was outraged by the opening of the park; she said that "this park is hard to beat when it comes to tastelessness!", adding that "it is obviously not enough for Aliyev that he has won the conflict over Nagorno-Karabakh militarily and that he can now set about emptying the areas inhabited by the Armenians and razing Armenian churches to the ground" Freedom House researcher Nate Shenkkan stated that the park is a "Clear and depressing description of the highly predictable death of hopes for liberalization in post-war Azerbaijan".

The Lemkin Institute characterized the Trophy Park as "one of the most openly and unapologetically racist acts of the 21st century."

=== Comparisons to Iraqi Victory Arch ===
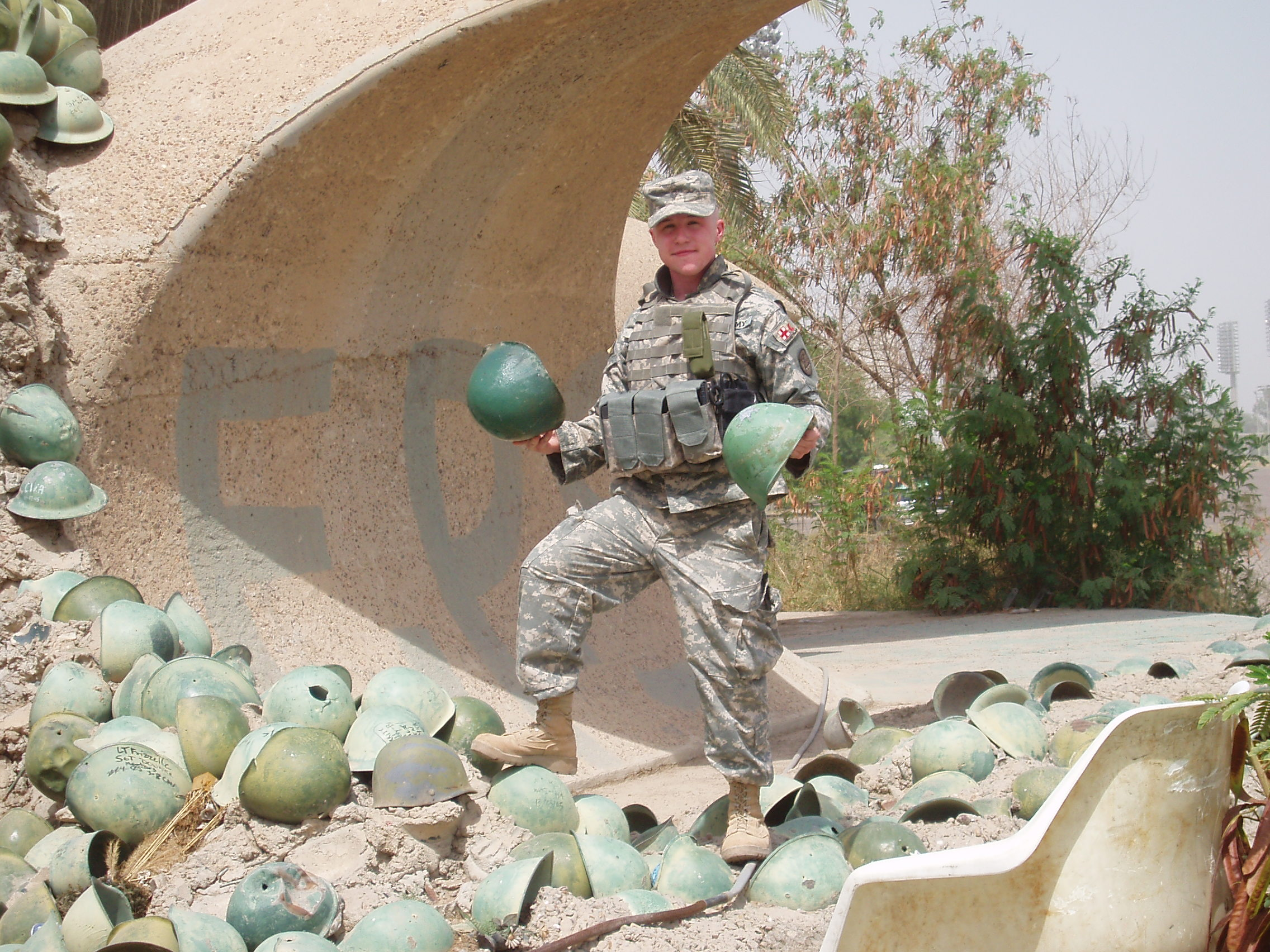
U.S. Soldier posing with the helmets at the Victory Arch, which the park has been compared to

Bloomberg's Bobby Ghosh commented that that park is "deeply ghoulish" and that it "brings to mind the collection of helmets at the base of the "Victory Arch" in Baghdad, which Saddam claimed belonged to Iranian soldiers killed in the 1980–88 war." National Interest's Michael Rubin also compared the park to the Victory Arch created under the regime of former Iraqi President Saddam Hussein.

A video by Armenian news channel Civilnet stated that Aliyev's actions were similar to Saddam Hussein's decision to open a monument displaying helmets of dead Iranian servicemen in the Iran-Iraq war and the caricatures were compared to World War II propaganda with exaggerated features of Jews and the Japanese.

In his speech at PACE Armenian politician Edmon Marukyan showed photos from the park, in one of them an "Azeri child playing playfully, innocently with a racist caricature of an Armenian soldier who is currently languishing, and likely being tortured in an Azerbaijani jail", calling it "true fascism" and declaring that the park puts Aliyev in "the list of other dictators such as Hitler and Saddam Hussein", driving parallels between what is going on in Azerbaijan now and "Iraq in the late 1980s, when another dictator [Saddam Hussein] utilized five thousand Iranian helmets of the killed soldiers extracted from the battlefield to complete the monument that he had called the “Victory Arch”.

== Gallery ==
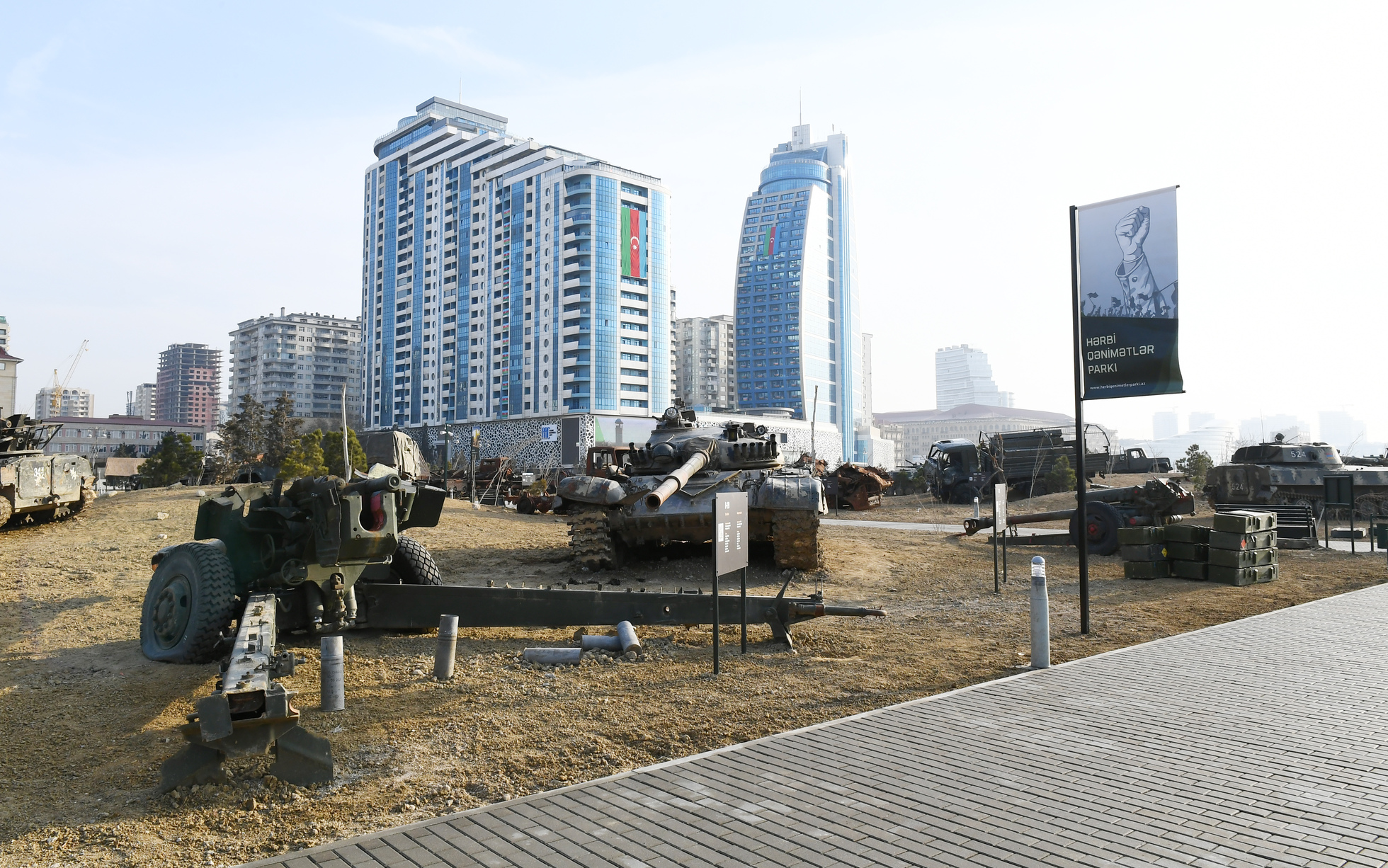
Seized equipment

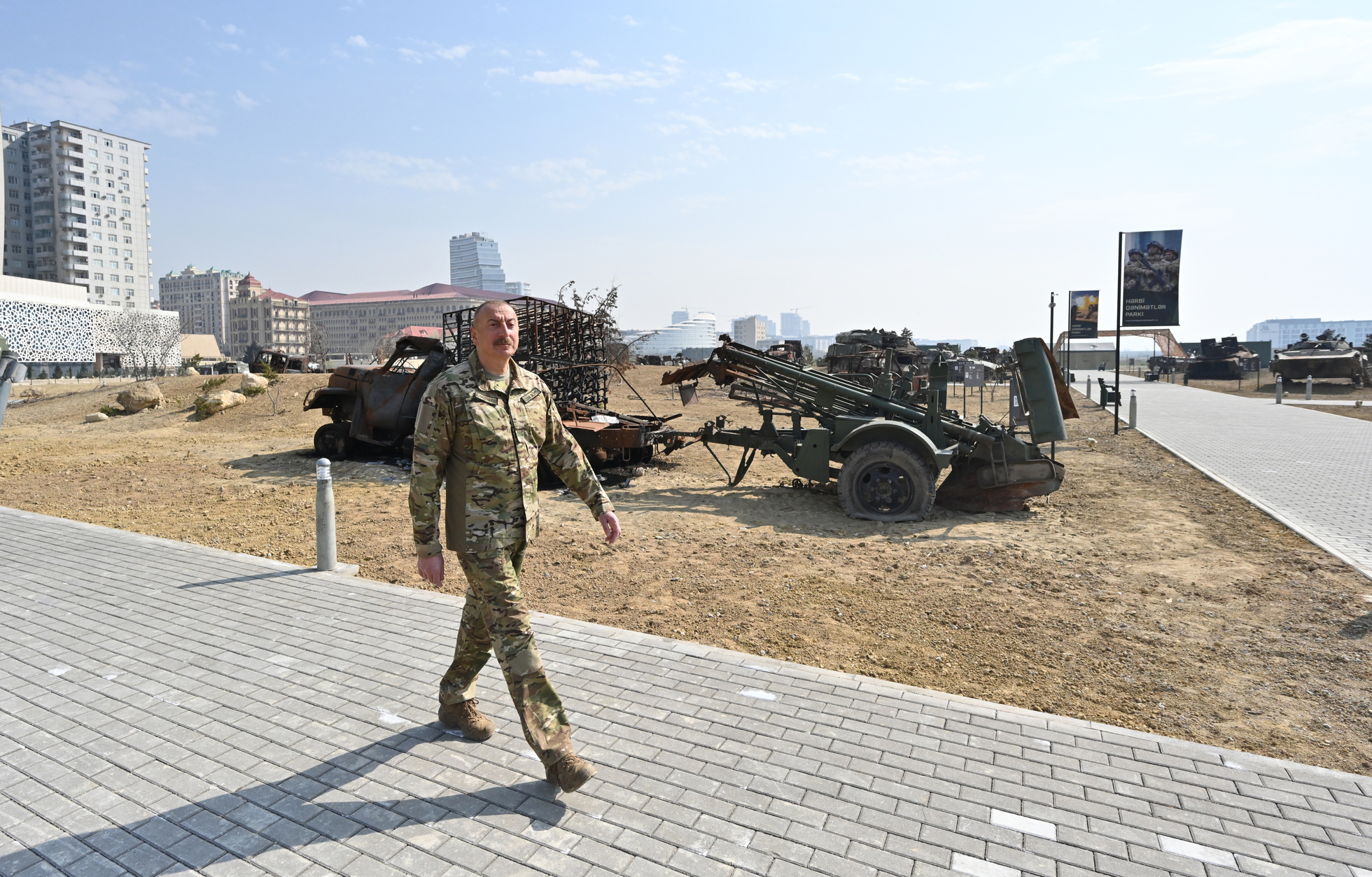
Ilham Aliyev in front of the seized equipment

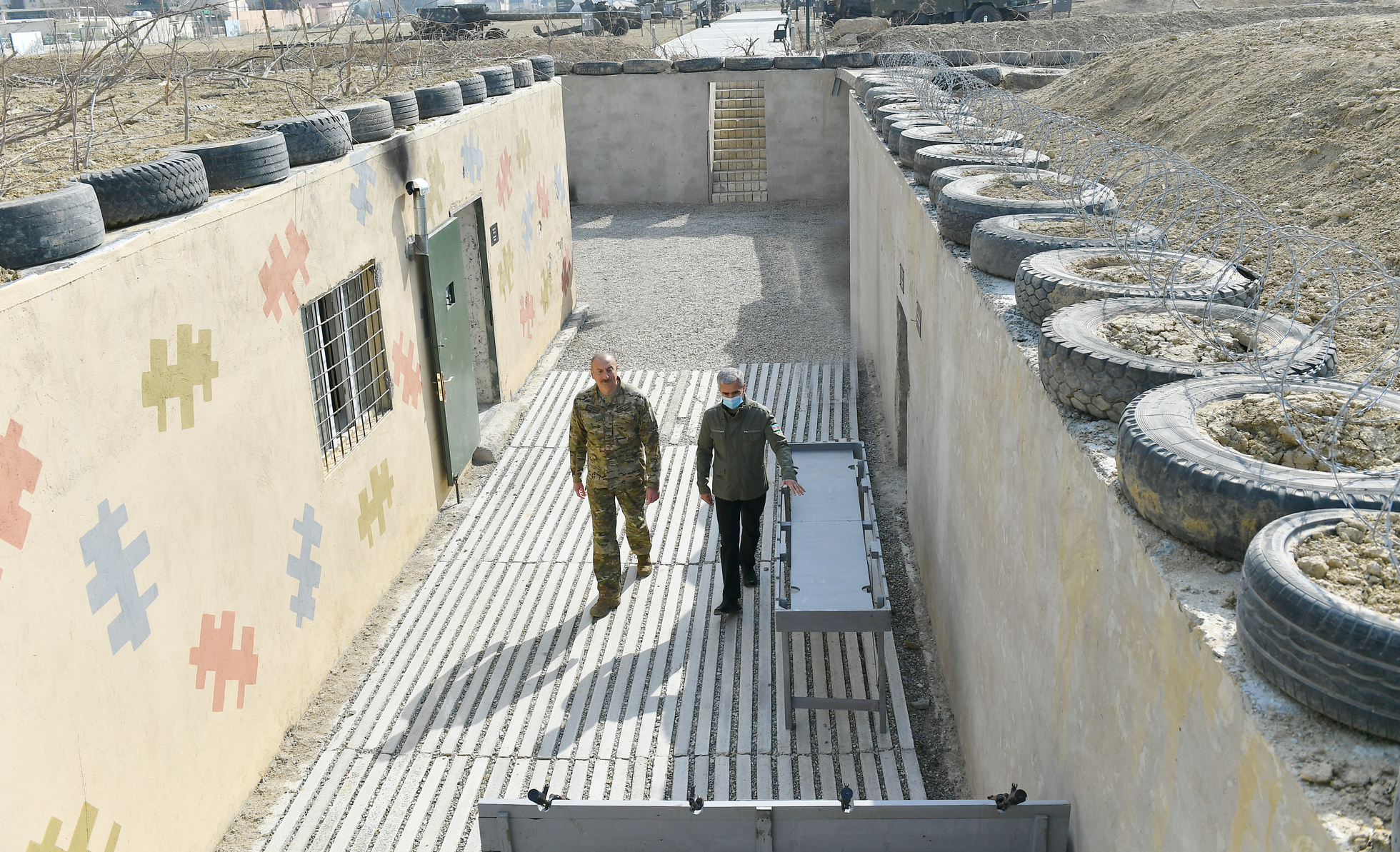
Aliyev walking through the park

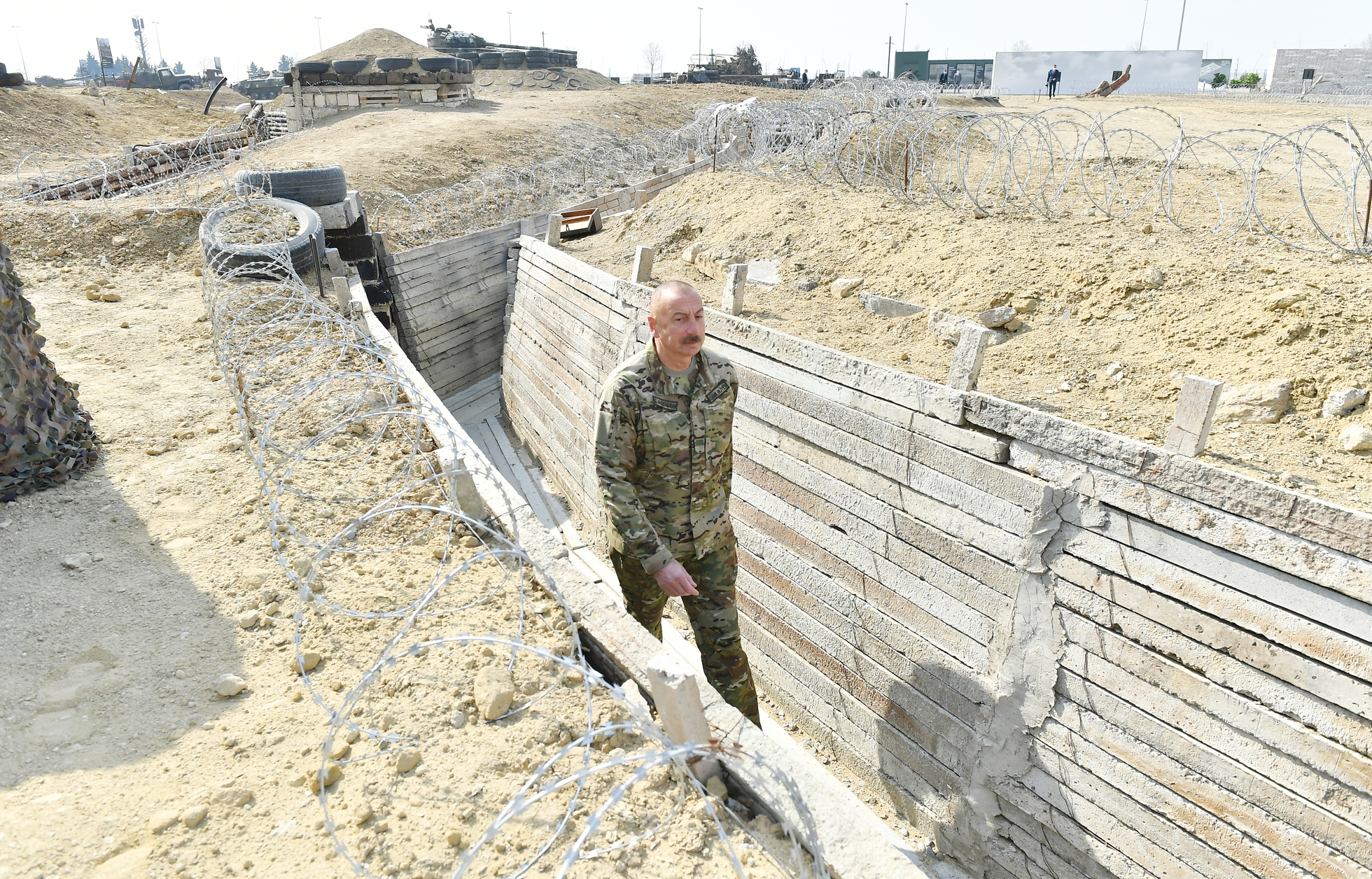
Aliyev walking through the trench

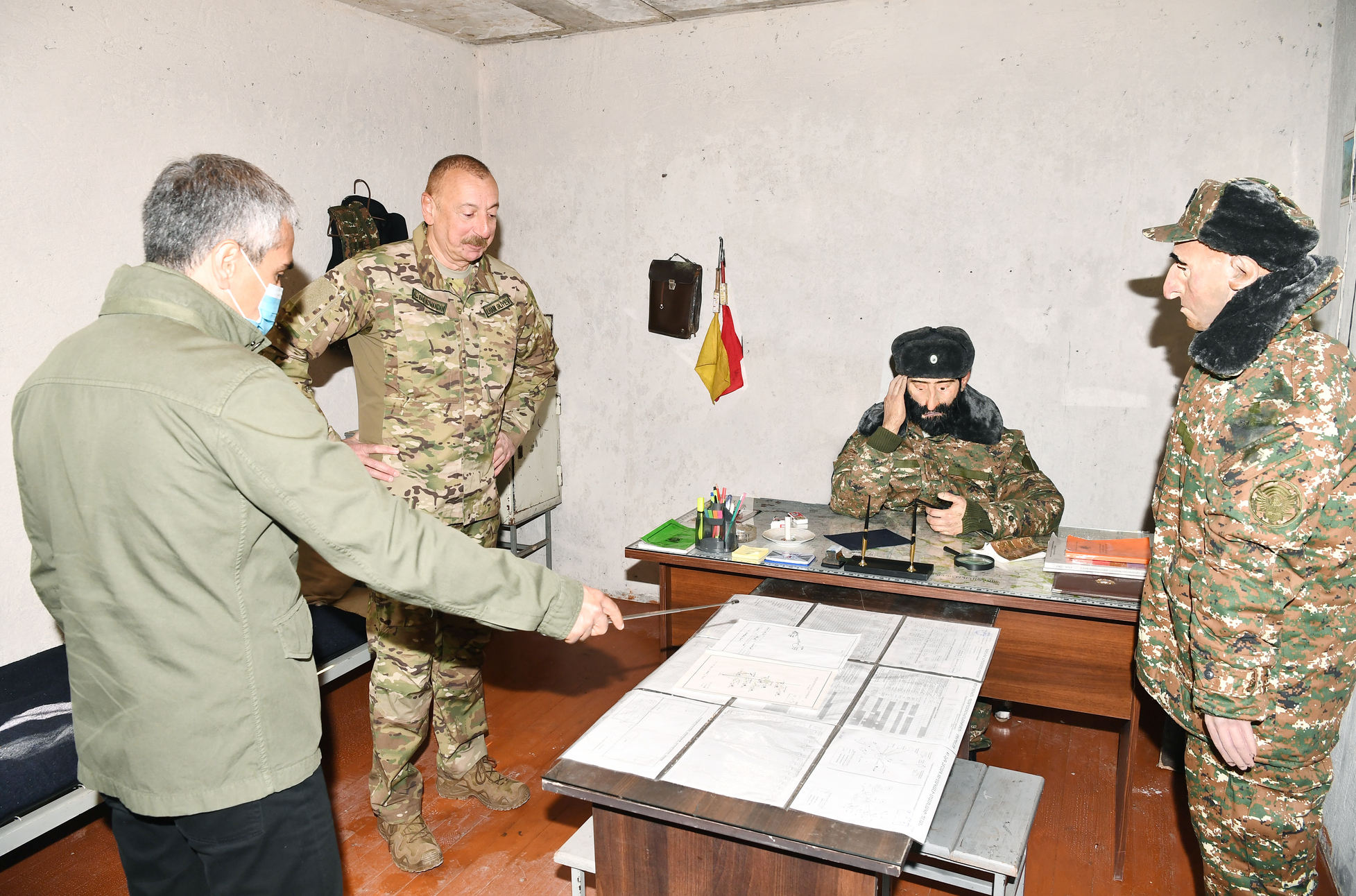
Aliyev with the wax mannequins of Armenian soldiers

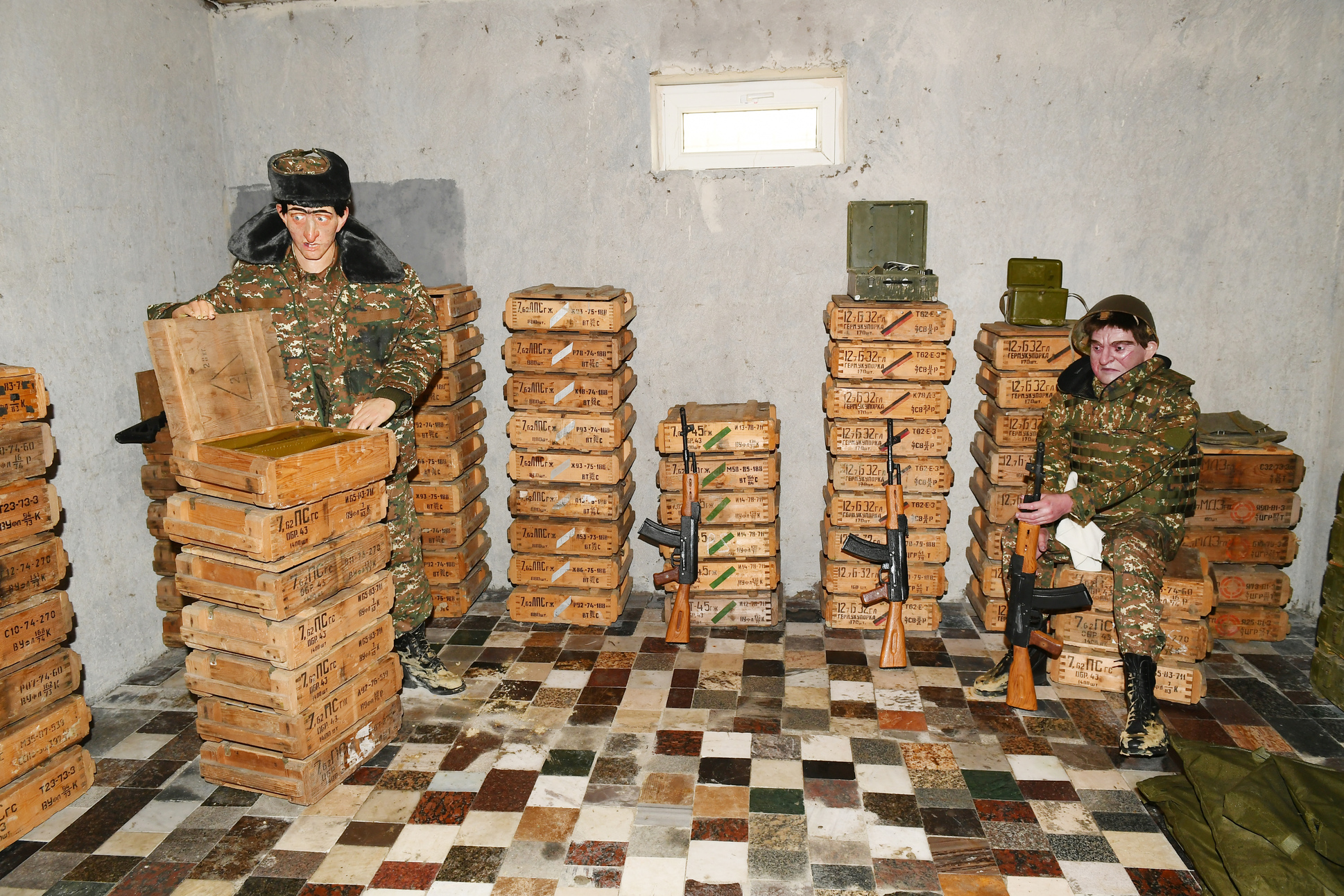
Wax mannequins of Armenian soldiers

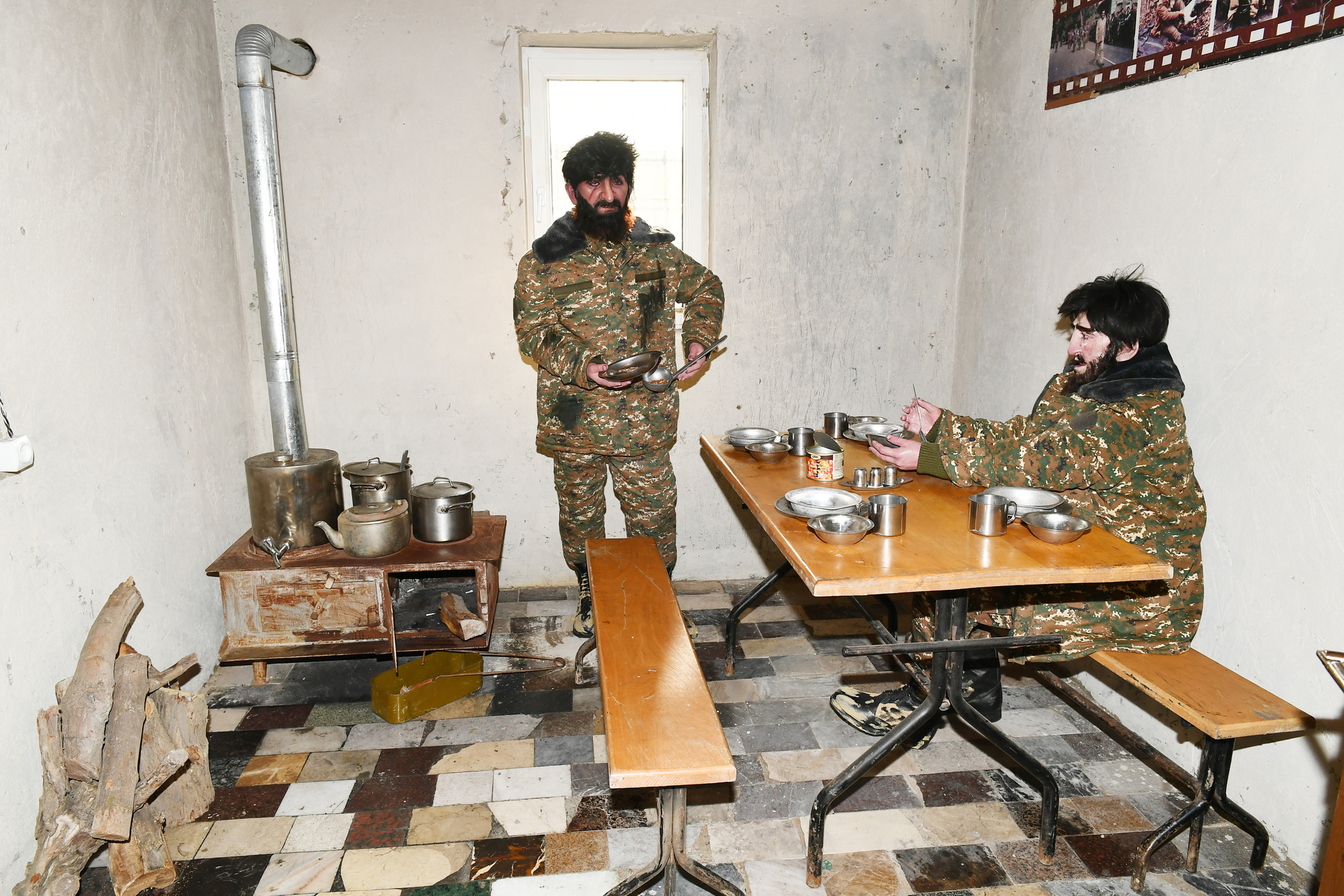
Wax mannequins of Armenian soldiers

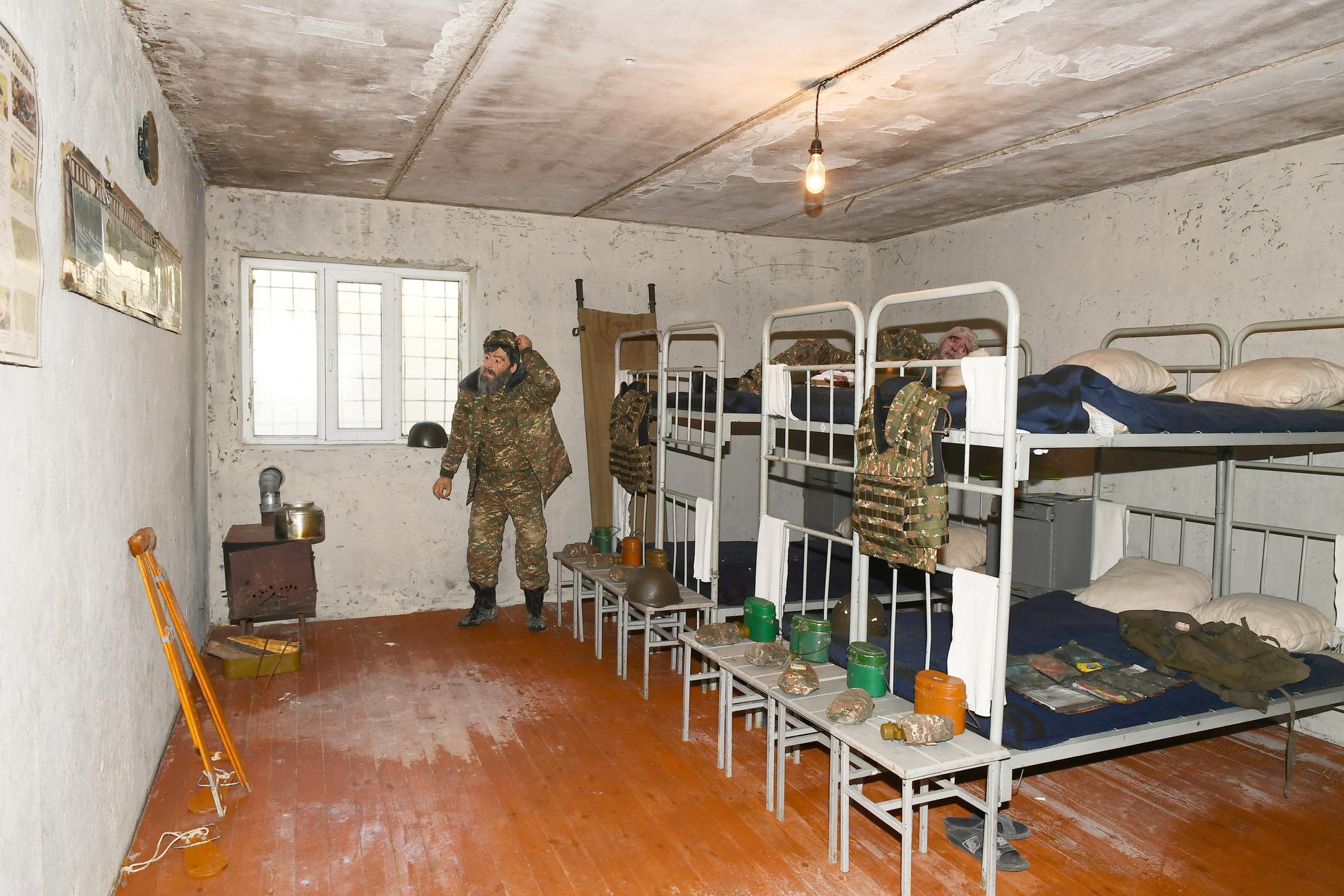
Wax mannequin of an Armenian soldier

== See also ==
- Victory Arch
