= Monument to the Unknown Soldier, Baghdad =

Monument in Baghdad, Iraq

Monument to the Unknown Soldier
- نصب الجندي المجهول
- Coordinates: 33.3085°N 44.3890°E
- Designer: Khaled al-Rahal and Marcello D'Olivo
- Material: Steel, copper, marble, glass, granite, reinforced concrete and acrylic
- Width: Dome is 42 m (138 ft) (diameter) on a hill 250 m (820 ft) in diameter
- Beginning date: 1979
- Opening date: 1982
- Dedicated to: Fallen Iraqi soldiers

The Monument to the Unknown Soldier (Arabic: نصب الجندي المجهول, romanized: naṣb al-jundiyyi al-majhūli) is a monument in central Baghdad designed by Italian architect Marcello D'Olivo based on a concept by Iraqi sculptor Khaled al-Rahal and constructed between 1979 and 1982. It was dedicated to the martyrs of the Iran–Iraq War. In 1986 the national square of Iraq, Great Celebrations square, was built near the monument, and two other monuments were built close to the square in memory of the martyrs. In 1983, the Al-Shaheed Monument on the River, was opened and in 1989 the newly built Victory Arch became the entrances to the square. The Unknown Soldier's Monument represents a traditional shield (dira'a) dropping from the dying grasp of an Iraqi warrior. The monument also houses an underground museum.

== Background ==
The Monument to the Unknown Soldier was commissioned in 1979 and completed in 1982. It was part of a broader Ba'athist government program to build a number of public works that would help instil a sense of national pride, and at the same time immortalise Saddam Hussein's reputation as a powerful leader. Saddam turned to his favourite artist, Khaled al-Rahal, who did more than any other Iraqi artist to incorporate ancient motifs in his work, to devise the concept for the monument.

Following the construction of the Monument to the Unknown Soldier, another colossal structure, the Al-Shaheed Monument (1983) was opened in the same area, and Saddam commissioned a third monument, the Victory Arch, another concept, also by the sculptor, Khaled Al-Rahal, to be built in the same vicinity (commenced in 1983 and completed in 1989 after the sculptor's death). The three monuments form a visual and psychological unit, and all represent the pain and suffering of the eight-year war.

== Description ==
The original concept was the work of Iraqi sculptor, Khaled al-Rahal, with the architectural designs developed by the Italian architect, Marcello D'Olivo.

The monument sits on top of an artificial hill, shaped like a low, truncated cone of 250 m diameter. The monument itself consists of several elements grouped on the hilltop. The centrepiece is a cantilevered dome, 42 m in diameter, with an inclination of 12 degrees and made of reinforced concrete. The dome represents a dira'a (Iraqi shield) falling from the grasp of a dying warrior.

At the side of the dome, is a spiral tower, which is reminiscent of the minaret at Samarra. Its external surface is clad with copper, while its inner surface features a soffit finished with pyramidal modules alternating steel and copper. The promenade is covered by a semi-circular, flat roof supported on a triangular steel bracing. The roof is covered with a copper sheet and the soffit displays V-shaped panels of stainless steel and Murano glass. It is surrounded by slanting girders of triangular section that are covered with marble. Red granite, stepped platforms of elliptical form lead to the dome and cubic sculpture. The steel flagpole is entirely covered with Murano glass panels fixed on stainless steel arms and displaying the national flag colours.

Beneath the shield is a cube, made of seven layers of metal, said to represent the seven levels of Jannah in the Islamic faith. Inside the layers of metal are sheets of red acrylic, said to represent the blood of the slain Iraqi soldiers. The cube itself is connected to the underground museum by a long shaft with windows that allow light to shine in from above. Inside the museum, visitors can look up at the ceiling and see through the openings leading to the cube above.

The monument appeared on the Iraqi dinar bank-note in the 1990–2003 series.

== First Unknown Soldier monumental arch ==
The 1982 Monument to the Unknown Soldier was not the first of such monuments to be constructed in Baghdad. In 1959, an arched monument to the Unknown Soldier was erected in Baghdad's Firdos Square. It was designed by Iraqi architect, Rifat Chadirji, and was a modern adaption of the arch of Ctesiphon in the ancient capital of the Parthian Empire.

Sketches of the design found at the Institute of Fine Arts in Baghdad, reveal the inspiration for the design which represents a mother bending over to pick up her martyred child. Described as a simple, symbolic, modernist structure, a comparison between the original and its later replacement illustrates the increasing level of abstraction and sophistication in Iraqi art during the period.

The original was removed from al-Fardous Square to make way for a statue of Saddam Hussein in the early 1980s. The replacement statue was destroyed by the American forces after they captured Baghdad in 2003 while the world watched via television.

Reports that Chadirji had been invited to rebuild the monument circulated for many years, but no progress has been evident, and the elderly Chadirji has since emigrated to England, where he lived with his wife, and where he died on April 10, 2020.

The original Unknown Soldier Monument (1959) by Rifat Chadirji

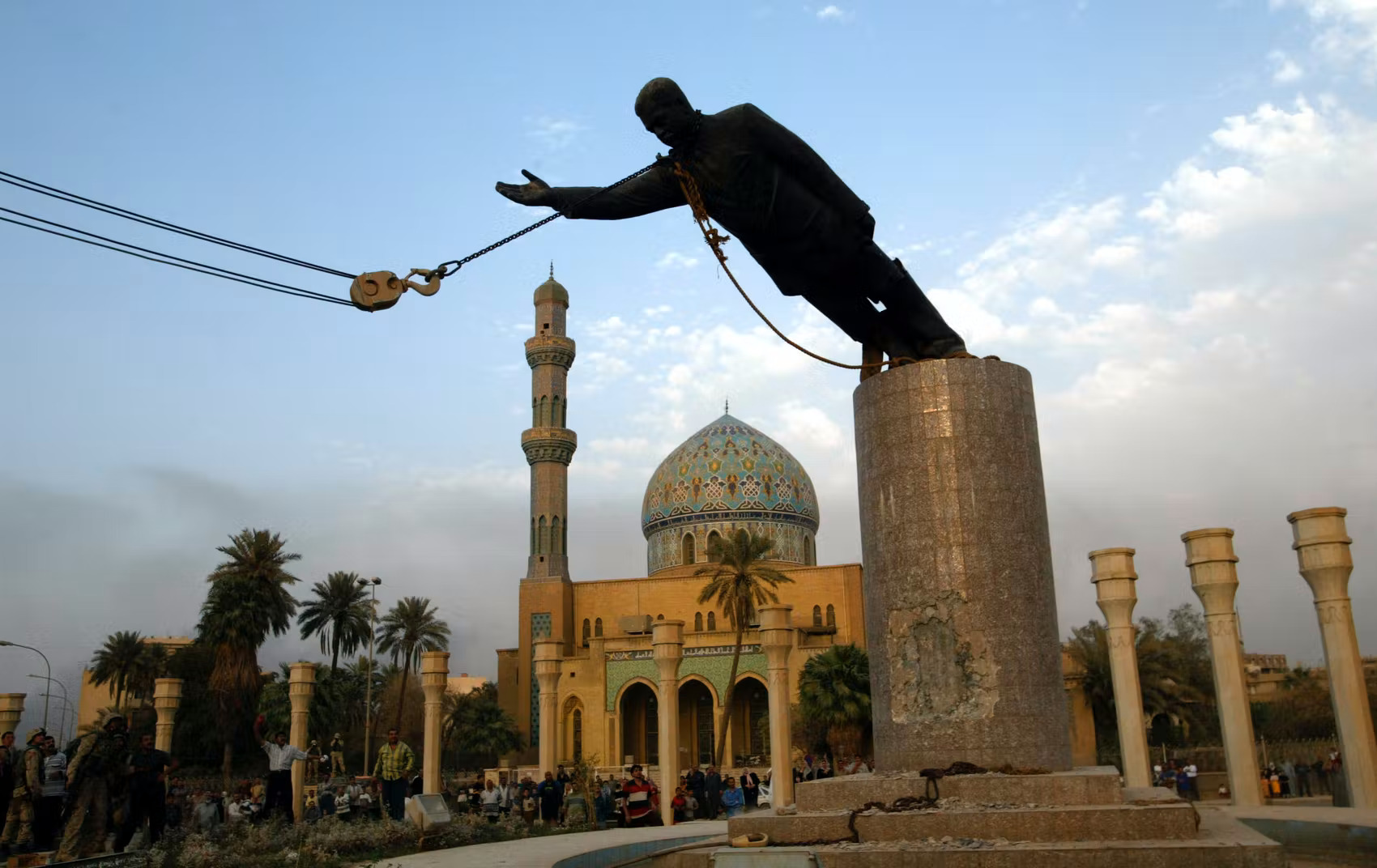
The statue of Iraqi dictator Saddam Hussein that replaced the original Monument to the Unknown Soldier (1959) was removed by Iraqi civilians and US soldiers in 2003

== See also ==
- Iraqi art
- Lists of war monuments and memorials
- Tomb of the Unknown Soldier
