= Khaled al-Rahal =

Iraqi painter and sculptor (1926–1987)

- خالد الرحال
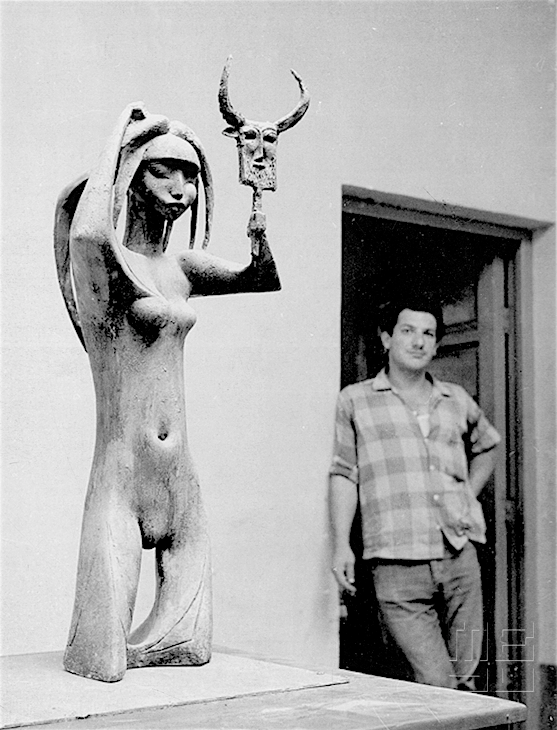
- Khaled Al-Rahal with one of his works, "An Eastern Woman on Her Wedding Night." Baghdad, 1961
- Born: 1926; Baghdad, Mandatory Iraq
- Died: 1987 (aged 60–61); Baghdad, Ba'athist Iraq
- Education: Baghdad Institute of Fine Arts (1947); Academy of Fine Arts, Rome (1964)
- Known for: Painter and sculptor
- Notable work: Swords of Qādisīyah; The Monument to the Unknown Soldier

Khaled Al-Rahal (also given as Khālid al-Raḥḥāl, 1926–1987) (Arabic: خالد الرحال) was an Iraqi painter and sculptor and one of the leaders of the modern art movement in Iraq. Described as one of the "pillars of modern Iraqi art," he was responsible for executing a number of high-profile public monuments in Baghdad in the mid-20th century.

== Life and career ==
Born in Baghdad in 1926 into a poor family, Khaled al-Rahal grew up on Baghdad's streets and alleyways which became an important influence on his life and art. He was an acute observer of daily Iraqi life, and a regular visitor to the Iraqi Museum, established in 1939, where he showed great interest in Iraq's ancient sculptures, particularly Assyrian and Mesopotamian reliefs. Even before he studied art academically, his sculpture had developed a mature artistic vision, grounded in Mesopotamian art traditions.

During the Anglo-Iraqi War, he was just a teenager when the first signs of an art revival began in Baghdad. A group of Polish artists, mainly impressionists, had sought refuge in Baghdad, where they introduced local artists to European art. While, this created considerable enthusiasm for modern abstract art, it also left many local artists, including al-Rahal, searching for a way to integrate their ancient art traditions within modern, abstract artworks.

Throughout the 1940s, al-Rahal maintained a studio in Baghdad's commercial district, where he made and sold busts of the Iraqi monarch and other works, all of which were very popular with the public. The Iraqi artist, Jabra Ibrahim Jabra, described his visit to al-Rahal's studio in the following terms:

"I shall never forget how one evening in 1948 (he was twenty-two then, and unknown), he took me to a tiny, shabby room in a small shabby house in one of Baghdad's oldest quarters, where we sat on a rush-mat and out of a battered chest he produced, like a magician, a pile of most beautiful drawings, many of which were studies for his sculpture. They were mostly drawings of women: in public baths, or belly-dancing or making love, all fat, full-fleshed, vibrating with the intensity of being alive."

At war's end, al-Rahal, by then in his early twenties, was part of a small group of talented, local artists who were granted scholarships to study art at the Baghdad Fine Arts Institute or abroad in either Paris or Rome. Al-Rahal received his earliest formal education at Baghdad Institute of Fine Arts under the supervision of the eminent Iraqi sculptor, Jawad Saleem, graduating with a Diploma in Sculpting in 1947.

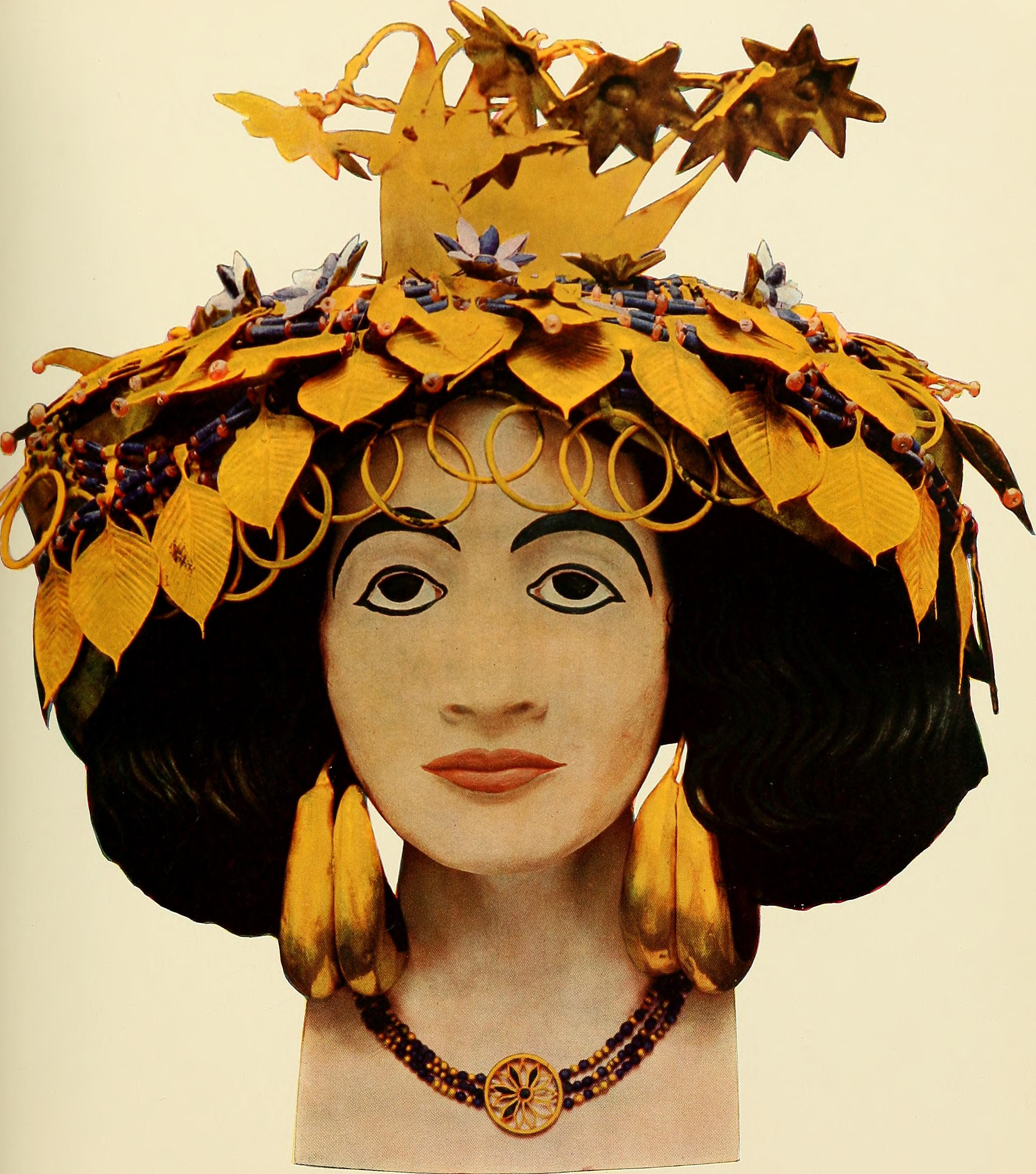
The original bust of the Sumerian Queen, Shuba'ad, displayed at the Iraq Museum, for which al-Kahal made a replica

Like many of his contemporaries, al-Rahal started out by working for the Iraq Museum under the Director of Antiquities, Naji al-Asil in the 1950s, where he was employed to make replicas of Iraq's ancient art pieces. During this period, he was commissioned to reproduce a bust of Sumerian Queen, Shuba'ad. He dressed her in royal jewelry from the Cemetery at Ur. The bust went on public display at the Museum, where it became an iconic image of Iraq's Sumerian past. Replicas of the bust were sold in tourist outlets and the figure became one of the most reproduced images in Iraqi art, being used on postcards, posters, souvenirs and in popular art.

In 1953 al-Rahal joined Jama’et Baghdad lil Fen al-Hadith (The Baghdad Modern Art Group) founded in 1951, by his friend and mentor, Jawad Saleem, along with the artist and intellectual, Shakir Hassan Al Said. The group, which would have a far-reaching impact on Iraqi art sought to bridge the gap between modernity and tradition, by developing a distinctive Iraqi art aesthetic which employed modern techniques, but at the same time referenced its ancient heritage and tradition. Hassan, the group's leader promoted the idea of istilham al-turath – "seeking inspiration from tradition" and wrote a manifesto for the group. Al-Khalel was an ardent admirer of Jawad Saleem and committed to his ideals.

In the early 1960s, he was awarded another scholarship to study at the Academy of Fine Arts in Rome, which further exposed him to the fundamentals of European sculpture. He obtained a Master of Fine Arts in 1964. He remained in Rome throughout most of the 1960s, and produced several public works for the city of Rome.

Around the time of his return to Baghdad, the reigning monarch was murdered, the monarchy abolished and a republic established. While many artists fled Iraq at this time, al-Khaled decided to remain in Baghdad. The Ba'ath party became an important patron of the arts, and encouraged local visual artists to demonstrate a cultural connection between modern Iraqi people and ancient Sumerian peoples. Under, Saddam Hussein, the Ba'ath Party co-opted the Baghdad Modern Art Group because its objectives aligned with their vision of a National Arab identity. Artists who were members of Baghdad's art groups were offered lucrative positions at the Ministry of Culture. Sculptors, architects and engineers, in particular, benefited from Hussein's program to beautify the city of Baghdad as numerous public art works were commissioned. These works were designed to instil a sense of national pride within the population, as well as to immortalise the leader, Saddam Hussein.

Al-Khaled, who more than any other artist, incorporated ancient Iraqi motifs in his artwork, flourished in Ba'athist Iraq. Throughout the 1970s, he designed several monuments commemorating historic Iraqi figures including: Abu Jafar al-Mansour, the 8th-century Abbasid Caliph and founder of Baghdad, the Lady of the Marshes, the March of the Ba'ath and Abd al-Karim Qasim, the Iraqi brigadier who overthrew the monarchy and established a republic in 1958 and also executed sculptures of everyday people such as Shaqawiyya (an Arab girl from southern Iraq) and the Mother and Child statue.

He became Saddam Hussein's favourite sculptor and ultimately designed many of important, large-scale public monuments. In 1973, he was commissioned to design the March of the Ba'ath Monument a fountain with bronze relief that narrated most of Iraq's history.

During the Iran-Iraq War, Saddam Hussein once again turned to his preferred sculptor to design two victory monuments; The Monument to the Unknown Soldier and the Swords of Qādisīyah (popularly known as the Victory Arch, both to be located at Zawra Park in remembrance of Iraq's pain and suffering during the war. The original concept for the Monument to the Unknown Soldier was Al-Khaled's original work, whereas the concept for the Victory Arch originated with Hussein while al-Kahal was left to work out the detailed design, always working in close collaboration with Hussein. The designs for both monuments included ancient and modern Arabic symbols of victory. The Monument to the Unknown Soldier was completed in 1982, but the Victory Arch was to be the sculptor's final work. The sculptor died before it was completed and his friend and assistant, Mohammed Ghani Hikmat, was left to finish the work.

Khaled al-Rahal died in Baghdad in 1987 and is buried beside the Monument of the Unknown Soldier.

== Work ==
Al-Rahal has been described as Iraq's "most gifted sculptor." Kahalid al-Kishtyan, of the Iraqi Cultural Centre in London, described al-Rahal and his mentor, Jawad Salim, as "the two pillars of modern Iraqi art."

Al-Rahal's work was influenced by the sculptures of early Mesopotamian civilization, particularly those of Babylon and Assyria, and a characteristic feature of his busts and sculptures is that they have the same structure and facial features as the ancient figures. In an interview with the Government Daily, al-Rahhal expressed the view that the Iraqi people were the direct offspring of the ancient Sumerians, and was quoted:

"There are some things that haven't changed. I was 16 years old when I worked in... the Iraqi Museum and completed [my bust] of the Sumerian Princess. I used to spend most of my [spare] time outside the museum studying the faces of women sour-milk vendors [of South Baghdad] for they represent the continuity in today's life, of the Sumerian people; the same eyes, sharp and broad; the brows running together, and the nose and the cut of the features. In this fashion, reality always provided me with models for my work."

For sculptures, he worked primarily in wood, plaster and metal. His themes are people of the streets and alleys, the poor men and women of everyday life as well as historic characters. Although he trained as a sculptor, Al-Rahal also enjoyed painting and exhibited many of these. However, a number of works on display at the Iraqi Museum of Modern Art were subject to the extensive looting that occurred following the US invasion of 2003.

During his lifetime, he produced an impressive body of large scale public works. However, not all of al-Rahal's monumental works have survived the various wars and revolutions befalling Iraq. Two of his public works were dismantled in the aftermath of the US invasion of 2003; one was his bust of Abu Jafar al-Mansur, the 8th-century Abbasid Caliph and founder of Baghdad and the other was the fountain known Nasb al-Maseera (or the March of the Ba'ath) formerly in Mathaf Square, both dismantled in October, 2005. Paintings and smaller sculptures are now in the National Art Gallery of Modern Art, Baghdad, in Moscow, New York, Shanghai, Paris, Rome, Venice, Lucca and Messina. Many of his works held at the National Gallery of Modern Art in Baghdad were looted in 2003.

=== Brief description of major public works ===
Nasb al-Maseera (also known as the March of the Ba'ath or the Journey Monument)
Description: Fountain with bronze relief plaques, depicting Iraqi people from different historical periods, climbing to the top of a hill and gathering there to represent Iraqis looking towards a better future along with their achievements over time. The monument also includes references to tradition through the inclusion of an Assyrian lion and a Mesopotamian bull standing over a fallen warrior.
Dimensions: 7–8 m (height)
Date: Commissioned in 1973 and dismantled in October, 2005.
Location: Formerly in Mathaf Square (near the intersection of the Iraq Museum and the bus station)

Mother and Child (also known as Motherhood)
Description: Motherhood was a recurring theme in Al-Kahal's work. The public statue is that of a semi-abstract figure of woman gazing out at the future generations while she shields a young child close behind her.
Dimensions: 4.5m (height)
Date: 1961
Location: Al-Umma Park, Baghdad

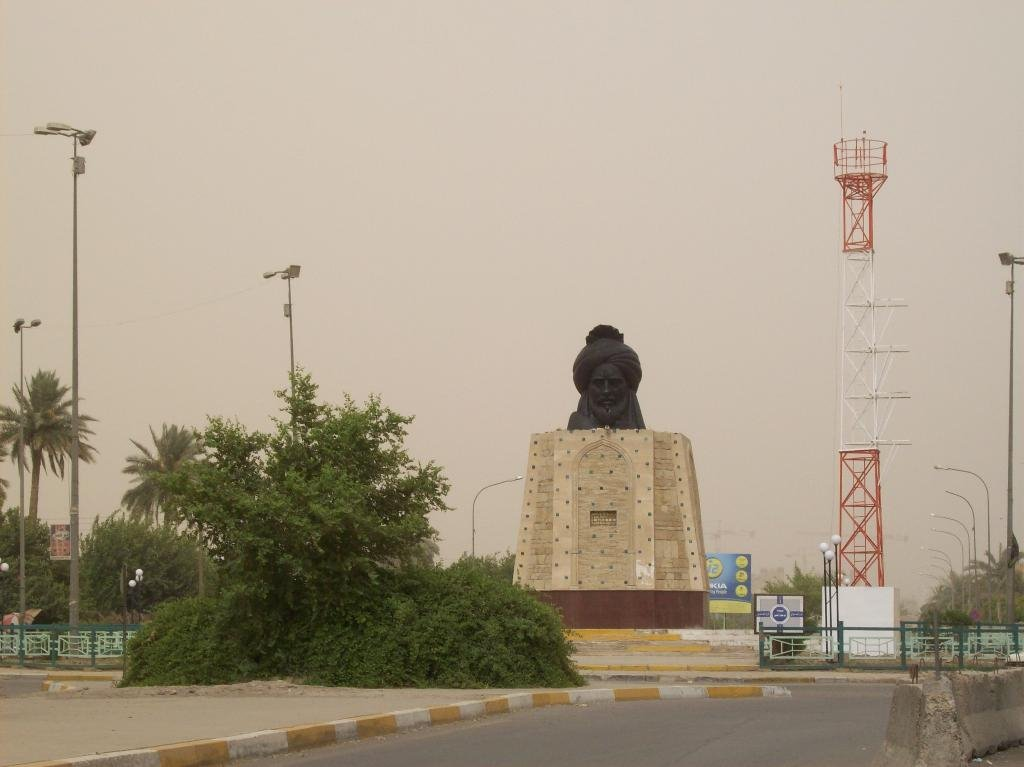
Bust of Abu Ja'far al-Mansour by Khaled al-Rahal, 1979

Abu Jaf'ar al-Mansour
Description: Bronze bust of 8th-century Abbasid Caliph and founder of Baghdad, Abu Ja'far Abdallah ibn Muhammad al-Mansur designed to serve as a link between Iraq's illustrious past and its bright future.
Dimensions: 2m bronze bust, mounted on a pillar
Date: Completed in 1976; inaugurated in 1979
Location: Formerly in the Mansour district, Baghdad; partially destroyed by bomb blast in 2003 and dismantled in 2005

The Unknown Soldier's Monument
Description: The monument consists of a group elements arranged on an artificial hill. The centrepiece is a cantilevered dome, of reinforced concrete, representing a dira'a (Iraqi shield) falling from the grasp of a dying warrior. At the side of the dome, is a spiral tower, which is reminiscent of the minaret at Samarra. Its external surface is clad with copper, while its inner surface features a soffit finished with pyramidal modules alternating steel and copper. The promenade is covered by a semi-circular, flat roof supported on a triangular steel bracing. The roof is covered with a copper sheet and the soffit displays V-shaped panels of stainless steel and Murano glass. It is surrounded by slanting girders of triangular section that are covered with marble. Red granite, stepped platforms of elliptical form lead to the dome and cubic sculpture. The steel flagpole is entirely covered with Murano glass panels fixed on stainless steel arms and displaying the national flag colours.

The original concept was the work of Iraqi sculptor, Khaled al-Rahal, with the architectural designs developed by the Italian architect, Marcello D'Olivo.
Dimensions: The shield is 42m in diameter, with an inclination of 12 degrees; the hill is 250m in diameter
Date: Commenced in 1979 and completed in 1983
Location: Zawra Park, Baghdad

Swords of Qādisīyah, also known as the Victory Arch
Description: The monument comprises a pair arches located at the entrances to Zawra Park. Each arch consists outstretched arms which appear to be exploding out of the ground and holding a sword which meet at a central point. The swords, which are made of stainless steel, are based on the weapons carried by Sa`d ibn Abi Waqqas, the Arab leader at the 7th-century, Battle of Qadisiya (from where the monument derives its Arabic name). A small flagpole rises from the point where the swords meet, at a point about 40 metres (130 ft) above the ground.

The origins of the concept are not entirely clear. Some sources suggest that the idea for the monument originated with a sketch by Saddam Hussein, while others suggest that it was primarily the work of the sculptor, Khaled al-Rahal in close collaboration with Hussein. Certainly, Saddam Hussein's torso served as inspiration for the work. Al-Rahal used photographs and plaster casts of Saddam's forearms as a model for the design of the hands. Toward the end of the project, after al-Khahal's death, the new project coordinator, Mohammed Ghani assumed control of the project and personally took an impression of one of Saddam's thumbs, with the resulting fingerprint added to the mould for one of the arches' thumbs. The arms rest on concrete plinths, and each plinth holds bronze nets containing some 2,500 helmets (a total of 5,000 helmets) which, Saddam claimed, belonged to Iranian soldiers killed during the war.
Dimensions: 40 metres in height; span of 30m
Date: Commenced in 1986 by Khaled al-Rahal, and completed in 1989 (after the sculptor's death) by Mohammed Ghani Hikmat, who had previously been al-Rahal's assistant on the project.
Location: Zawra Park, Baghdad

Abd al-Karim Qasim's statue
Description: Bronze statue of Abd al-Karim Qasim (1914–1963), military leader and Iraq's first Prime Minister. In 1959, he was the target of a failed assassination attempt. Saddam Hussein commissioned this sculpture to honour the leader as The Republic of Iraq's first martyr.
Dimensions: Unknown
Date: Constructed in the 1960s and repaired in 2005
Location: Originally in Abdul Karim Qassem Square, Al Rasheed Street; relocated to the courtyard of the Iraq Museum

=== Select list of smaller sculptures ===
- Women in a Public Bath, carved relief, 1920s
- Reclining Woman, date unknown
- Shergawi Woman on her Wedding Night, wood carving, 1926
- Shaqawiyya (Arab girl from southern Iraq), early 1960s
- Lady of the Marshes bronze sculpture, formerly in Al Hamza Square, Sadr City, Baghdad

== See also ==
- Iraqi art
- List of Iraqi artists
- Tomb of the Unknown Soldier
