= Al-Shaheed Monument =

Military memorial in Baghdad, Iraq

- نُصْب الشهيد
- Monument
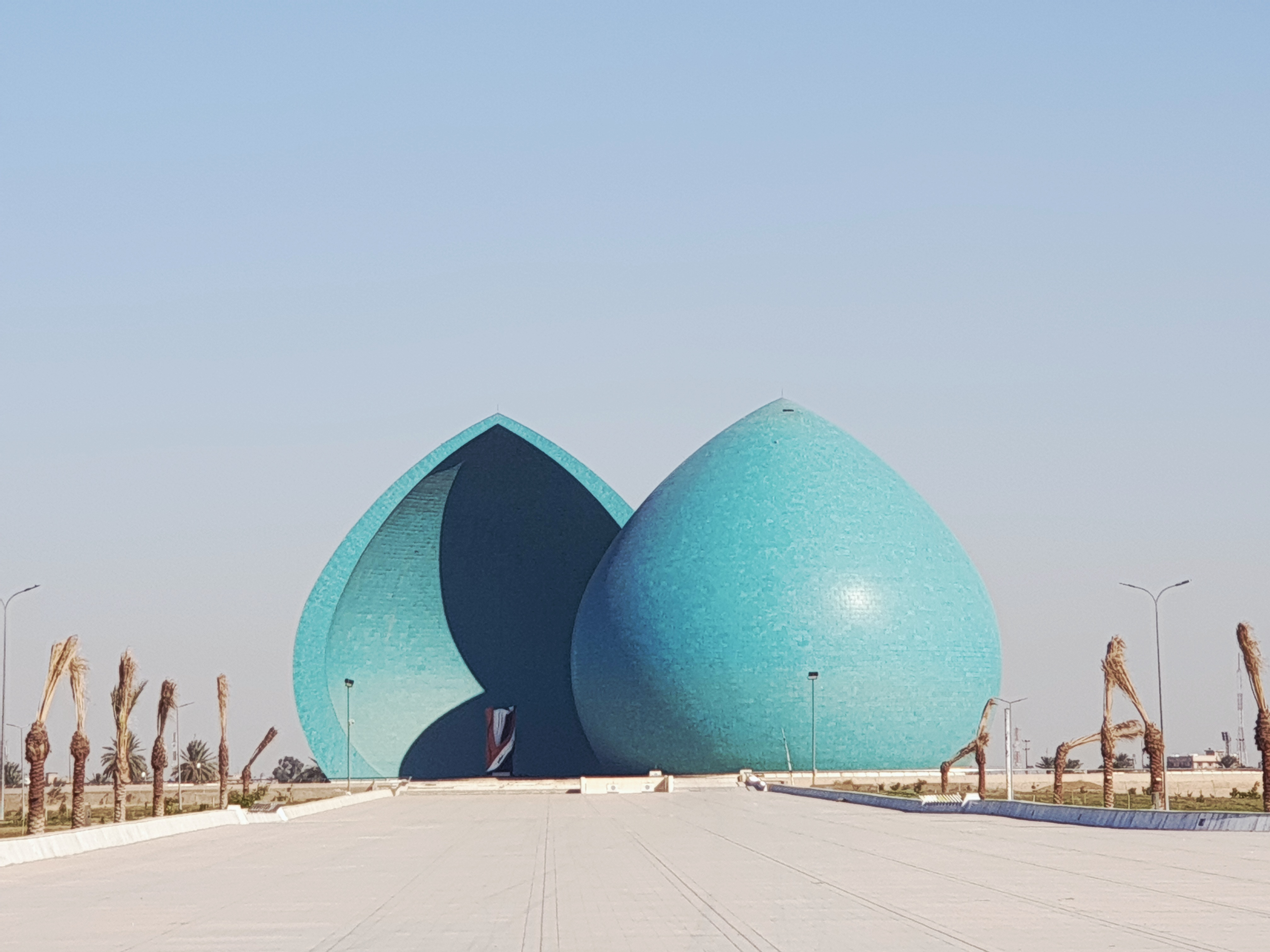
- For Iran–Iraq War
- Established: 1983
- Location: 33°20′36″N 44°26′46″E; Baghdad, Iraq
- Designed by: Ismail Fatah Al Turk; Saman Kamal

Al-Shaheed Monument (Arabic: نصب الشهيد, romanized: Nusb al-Shaheed), also known as the Martyr's Memorial, is a monument designed by Iraqi sculptor Ismail Fatah al-Turk and situated in the Iraqi capital, Baghdad. It was originally dedicated to the Iraqi soldiers killed in the Iran–Iraq War and has since grown to become generally considered to be a commemoration of all Iraqi martyrs.

== Background ==
Al-Shaheed was built as part of a broader Ba'athist government program to erect a number of public works intended to beautify Baghdad, help instill a sense of national pride, and at the same time immortalize Saddam Hussein's reputation as a powerful and victorious leader. It was built during the height of a period when Saddam Hussein was commissioning many artworks and spending a great deal of money on new monuments and statues.

Al-Shaheed was constructed on Baghdad's al-Rusafa side, and this monument is one of three monuments that were built to remember Iraq's pain and suffering as a consequence of the eight-year war. The first of these structures was The Monument to the Unknown Soldier (1982); followed by Al-Shaheed (1983) and finally the Victory Arch (1989). The three monuments form a visual and metaphorical unit.

== Design ==
Designed by the Iraqi sculptor and artist, Ismail Fatah al-Turk (1934–2004), and built in association with Iraqi architect, Saman Kamal, and the Baghdad Architecture Group, the monument was constructed between 1981 and 1983, with its official opening in 1983.

The monument consists of a circular platform 190 meters in diameter in the center of an artificial lake. On the platform sits a 40-meter tall split turquoise dome, which resembles the domes of the Abbasid era. The two halves of the split dome are offset, with an eternal flame in the middle. The outer shells are constructed of a galvanized steel frame with glazed turquoise ceramic tile cladding which was pre-cast in carbon fiber reinforced concrete. The interior is opulent, being that under the Iraqi flag, there is an open hole, or oculus, providing light below. The rest of the site consists of parks, a playground, parking lots, walkways, bridges, and the lake.

At the center of the two half-domes is a twisted metal flag pole emerging from the underground museum. On the pole is an Iraqi flag, apparently lightly fluttering in the breeze. When viewed from the museum below, the flag and pole appear to be floating in space. A spring of water runs nearby to symbolize the blood of the fallen. The structure includes references to Iraq's ancient art tradition in the form of a marble slab with Qu'ranic verses in ancient Kufi script.

The monument is located on the east side of the Tigris river, near the Army Canal which separates Sadr city from the rest of Baghdad. A museum, library, cafeteria, lecture hall, and exhibition gallery are located on two levels underneath the domes.

On the subject of the monument's design, Al-Turk made the following comments:

I insisted on having a large open space. Big monuments are originally from the East—the Pyramids, the Sphinx, the Obelisk, Minarets.. the earth is flat, so these monuments can be seen from all directions. In the beginning, I had the idea of having a martyr bursting from the center. But I did not like it, it was too theatrical. Then, the idea of life versus death began to form. The two pieces move together towards martyrdom and fertility and the lifestream. I moved the pieces until I got the interplay I wanted.

The completed monument cost half a million dollars (US). It is one of the most iconic monuments in Baghdad. The Art in America magazine rated al-Shaheed as the most beautiful design in the Middle East.

An image of the al-Shaheed monument appeared on the reverse face of the 1986 Iraqi 25 dinar bill (pictured).

== Gallery ==
The monument creates a visual illusion: viewed from some perspectives, it appears as a single dome, but from other perspectives, it appears as a split dome.

Al-Shaheed, as seen from different perspectives:

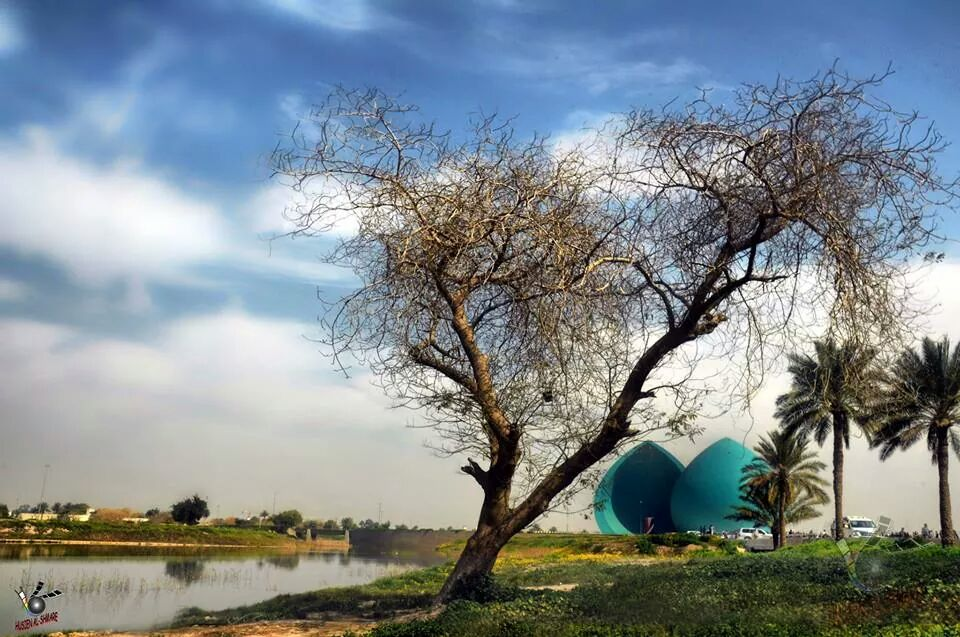

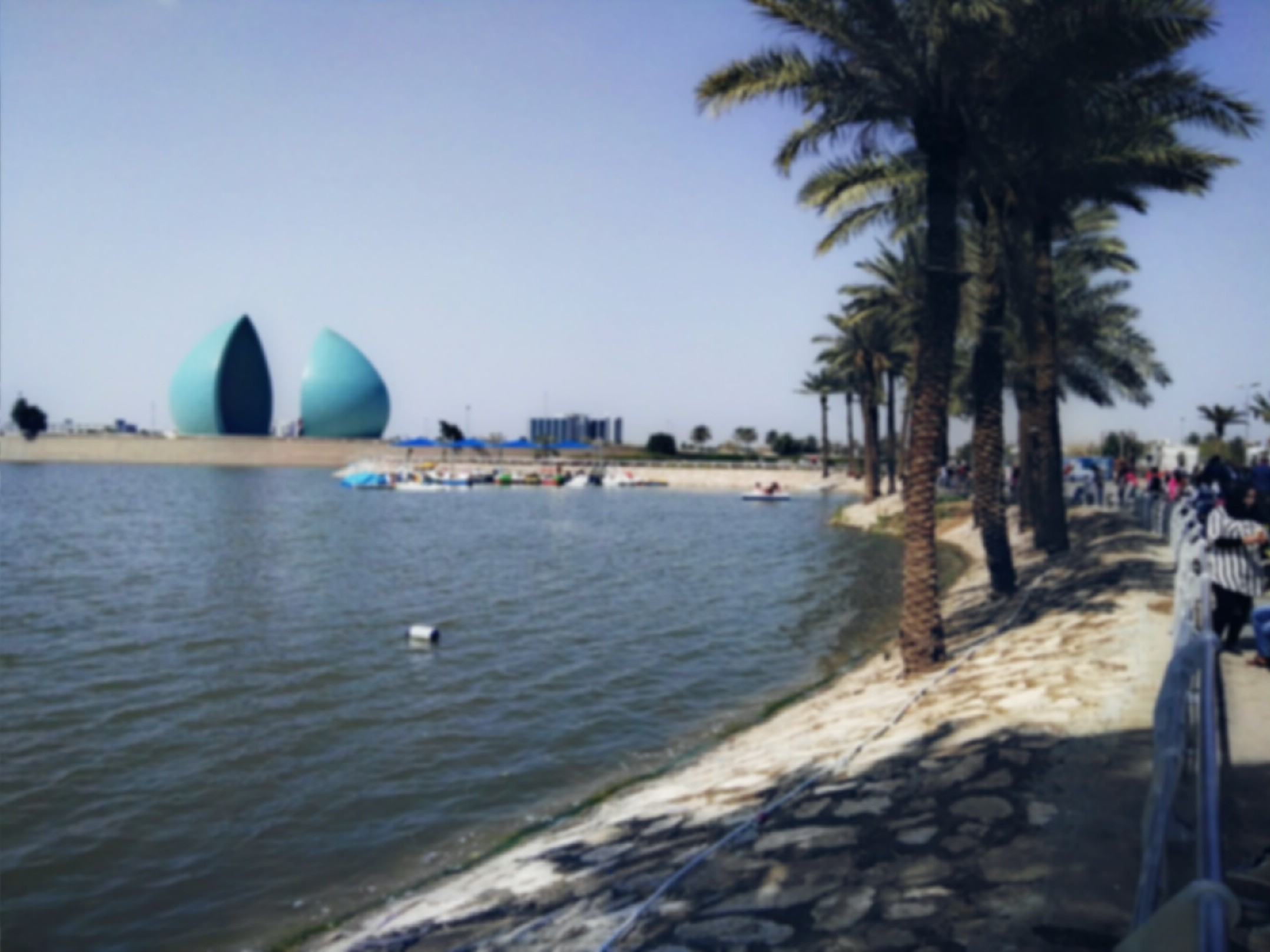

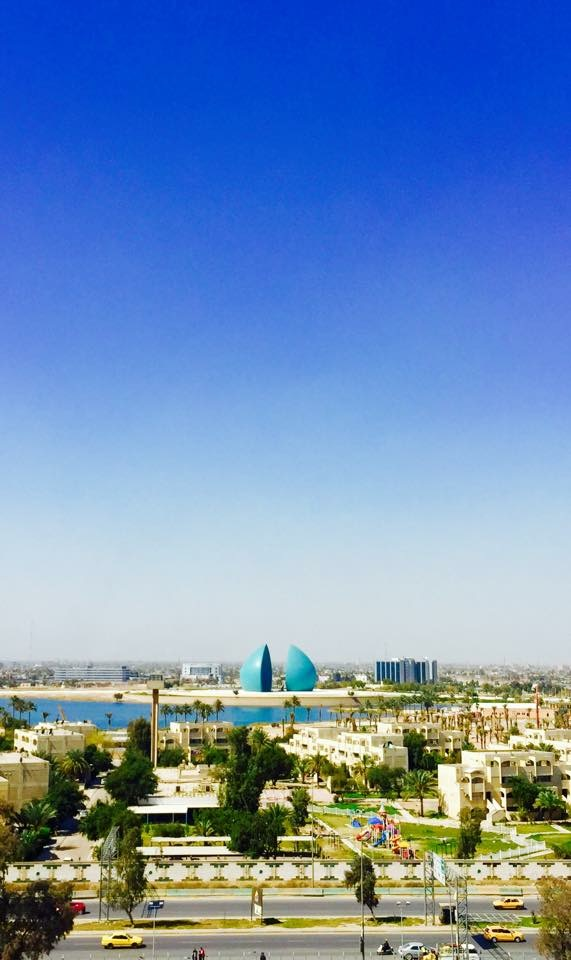

== See also ==
- Iraqi art
- Islamic art
- One Dimension Group
- Tomb of the Unknown Soldier
- Freedom Monument
- Victory Arch
