= Victory Arch =

Victory arch in central Baghdad, Iraq

Coordinates: 33°18′18.6″N 44°23′11.27″E

- قوس النصر (Swords of Qādisiyyah)
- The Victory Arch in 2011
- Interactive map of Victory Arch
- Designer: Khaled al-Rahal; Mohammed Ghani Hikmat
- Material: Concrete, stone, stainless steel and bronze
- Height: 40 metres (130 ft)
- Beginning date: 1986
- Completion date: 1989
- Opening date: 8 August 1989
- Dedicated to: Fallen Iraqi soldiers

The Victory Arch (Arabic: قوس النصر, romanized: Qaws al-Naṣr), officially known as the Swords of Qādisīyah, and popularly called the Hands of Victory or the Crossed Swords, are a pair of triumphal arches in central Baghdad, Iraq. Each arch consists of a pair of outstretched hands holding crossed swords. The two arches mark the two entrances to Grand Festivities Square and the parade ground constructed to commemorate the Iran–Iraq War, started and led by Iraq's then-president Saddam Hussein. The arches were opened to the public on 8 August 1989. It is one of Baghdad's visitor attractions and near to the Monument to the Unknown Soldier.

== Location ==
The two sets of arches mark the entrances to an area known as Zawra Park. In 1986 (two years before the war's end) the government of Iraq began the construction of a festival and parade ground in Zawra Park, near the extensive presidential complex in the center of Baghdad. Known as Grand Festivities Square, it comprised a large parade ground, an extensive review pavilion and a large reflecting pool. The surrounding grassy areas hosted Iraqis during military parades. Adding to the festive appeal of the grounds were three refreshments booths that sold ice cream, cold beverages, and candy. Three monuments were constructed to remember Iraq's pain and suffering as a consequence of the eight-year war. The Victory Arch was the last of the three structures to be built, and it followed on from the construction of the Monument to the Unknown Soldier, (1982) and Al-Shaheed Monument (1983). The three monuments form a unit.

The official name of the arches, the Swords of Qādisiyyah, is an allusion to the Battle of al-Qadisiyyah in 636 CE, when Arab armies defeated the Sasanian Empire and captured their capital of Ctesiphon, where an arch marks the entrance to the ancient imperial palace. Zawra Park was home to the Museum of Gifts to the President and a performing arts center. The museum was located on the ground floor of the grand reviewing pavilion where Saddam was known to review the Republican Guard while firing a weapon in the air. The museum contained ordinary items donated by Iraqis during his rule. Items included cheap plastic ornaments and drawings donated by Iraqi children.

== History ==
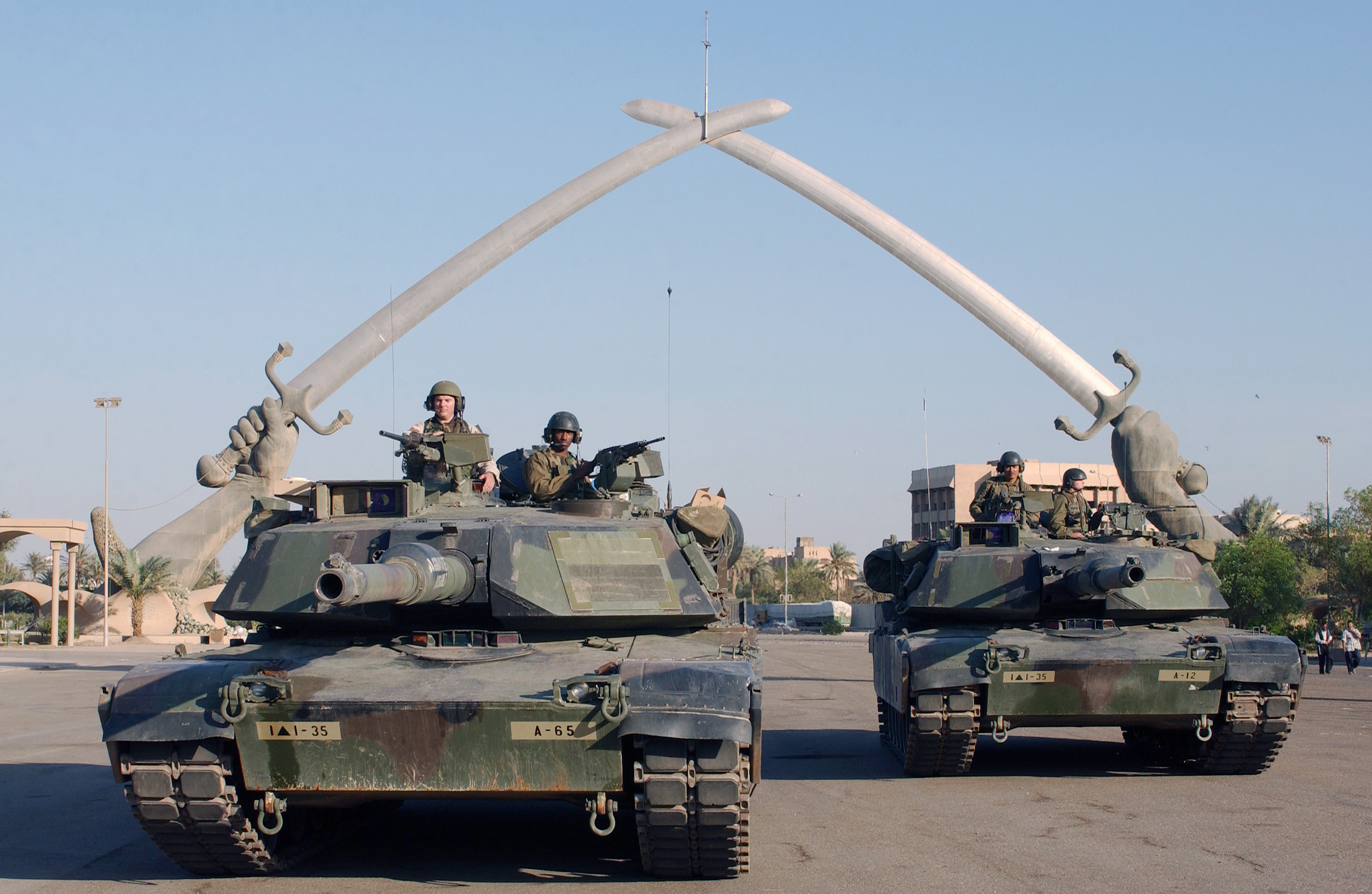
M1 Abrams at the Victory Arch during the occupation of Iraq, 2003.

Iraq's leading sculptor, Khaled al-Rahal, won the commission to design and execute the construction of the arches, which were based on a concept sketch made by president Saddam Hussein. The design consists of a pair of massive hands emerging from the ground, each holding a 43-metre-long (141 ft) sword. However, al-Rahal died in 1987, before the monument was completed, and another eminent Iraqi sculptor, Mohammed Ghani Hikmat, assumed control of the project. Both sculptors worked in close collaboration with Saddam Hussein. The monument was built as part of a broader program to beautify the city of Baghdad and to create public works that would help to instil a sense of national pride within the population. Baghdad is now dotted with monuments, including Al-Shaheed Monument and Monument to an Unknown Soldier, and many other statues, fountains and sculptures; all constructed between 1969 and 2003.

The site selected for the monument was where Arabs defeated the Sasanians, a Persian empire, and is generally seen to be the beginning of Islamic domination of the region. On the day the monument was dedicated in 1990, Saddam rode under the arches astride a white horse. It has been suggested that this was an allusion to the slain Shi'a martyr Husayn ibn Ali, killed in Karbala in 680, whose death caused the rift between Shiite and Sunni Muslims. The monument, although presenting a triumphalist narrative in relation to the Iran-Iraq war, has assumed a broader symbolism and represents those Iraqis who fell in any war throughout the country's history.

=== Recent developments ===
The monument was not destroyed during the Gulf War, though General Norman Schwarzkopf wanted to remove it. The arches remain standing in what is now the International Zone of Baghdad.

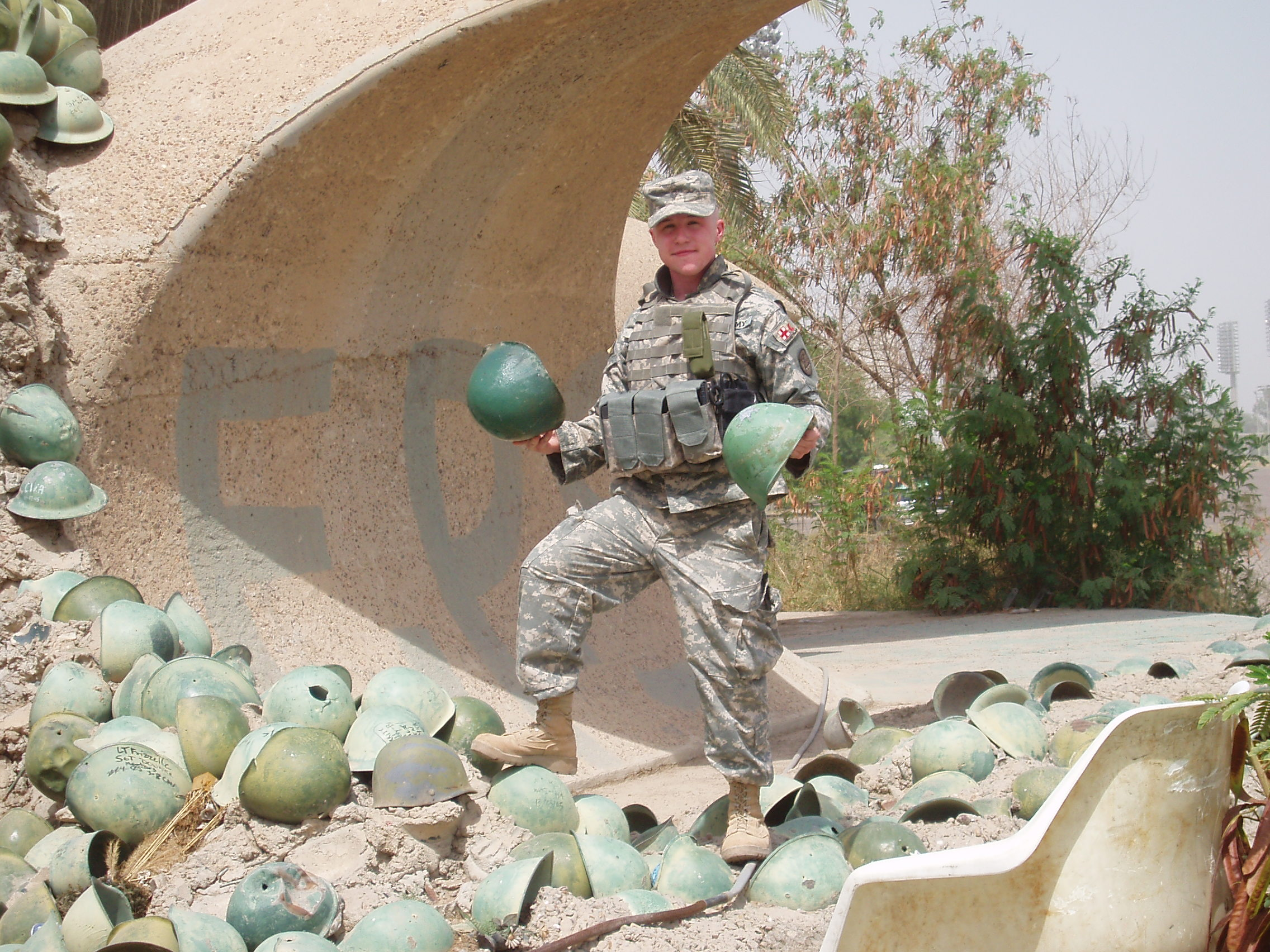
An American soldier poses with the Iranian helmets at the base of the Victory Arch

In February 2007, it was reported that the new Iraqi government had organized the Committee for Removing Symbols of the Saddam Era and that the Arc of Triumph monument had begun to be dismantled, which drew protests from Iraqi and preservationist groups.

The demolition began on Tuesday, 20 February 2007. At that time, 3-metre (10 ft) chunks had been cut out of the bronze monument. Numerous Iraqi bystanders and coalition troops were seen taking helmets and bits of the monument away as souvenirs. The decision to remove the monument, made by Prime Minister Nouri al-Maliki, was challenged by US Ambassador Zalmay Khalilzad, who blocked the demolition on 21 February. The government of Iraq reversed its earlier plans to demolish the monument.

In February 2011, Iraqi authorities began the restoration of the monument as a sign of reconciliation.

== Description ==
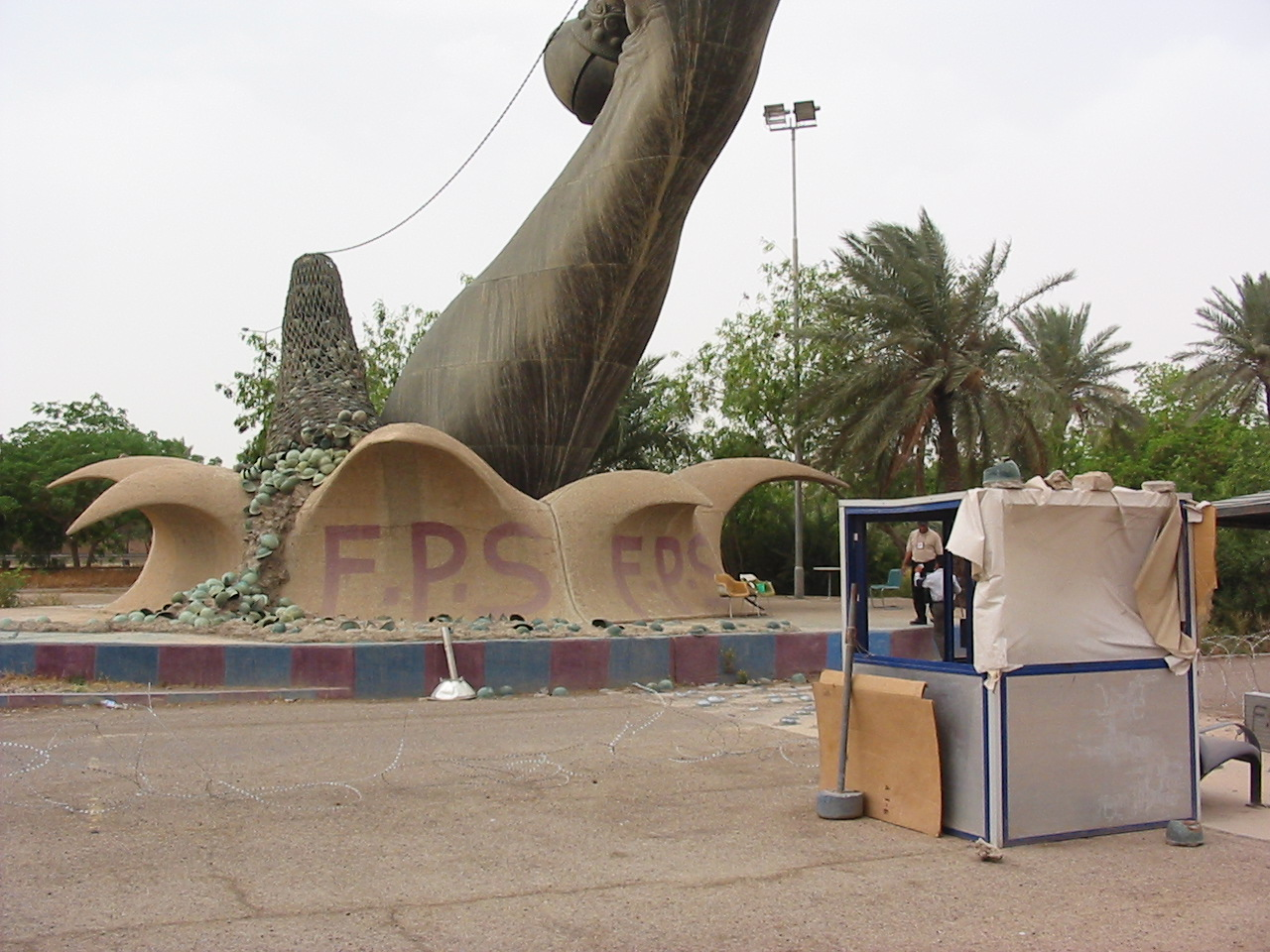
Victory Arch (detail) The giant hands appear to be bursting from the ground, with helmets of fallen soldiers scattered on the ground.

The monument consists of a pair of outstretched arms which appear to be exploding out of the ground, each holding a sword which meet at a central point. The swords, which are made of stainless steel, are based on the weapons carried by Sa'd ibn Abi Waqqas, the Arab leader at the Battle of Qadisiyya.

A small flagpole rises from the point where the swords meet, about 40 metres (130 ft) above the ground. Al-Rahal used photographs and plaster casts of Saddam's forearms as a model for the design of the hands. Toward the end of the project, after Ghani had taken over, the sculptor personally took an impression of one of Saddam's thumbs, and the resulting fingerprint was added to the mold for one of the arches' thumbs.

At the time, Iraq did not have a foundry sufficiently large to cast the sculpture, leading to much of it being made abroad. The arches were made by an international consortium led by the German foundry H+H Metallform. The blades of the stainless steel swords weigh 24 tons each. Cast in Iraq, they are partly composed of metal from guns and tanks of Iraqi soldiers killed in the Iran-Iraq war. The hands and arms of the monument are of bronze, cast in the United Kingdom at the Morris Singer foundry. The arms rest on concrete plinths, the form of which make the arms appear to burst up out of the ground. Each plinth holds 2500 helmets (a total of 5,000 helmets) which, Saddam claimed, belonged to Iranian soldiers killed during the war; they are held in nets which allow them to spill onto the ground beneath.

=== Physical specifications ===
The monument has a number of elements, each made from different construction materials:

The exploding ground
Constructed of reinforced concrete, with enemy helmets scattered around
Forearm and grip
Cast in bronze, each weighing 20 tons, fixed with a reinforced frame, also 20 tons
Swords
The swords have a slight curve, allowing them to meet in the middle, giving the arched shape. They are cast in stainless steel and each sword weighs 24 tons.
The net
The net was cast in bronze and each contains 2,500 enemy helmets
The flag pole
The flag and pole were made of stainless steel and rise 7 metres above the point where the arched swords meet

The monument has been described as "kitsch, totalitarian art." It was restored in 2011.

== Legacy ==
The Victory arch is one of Baghdad's most photographed monuments. Visitors who stand in a specific location can be photographed as if their own hands are holding the swords. The hands, which are hollow, present visitors with another photo opportunity- many troops and other coalition visitors have climbed up inside them to look out from the point at which the swords meet the hands, generally to have souvenir pictures taken.

The monument is also featured on the 100 dinar banknote for 1991.

== See also ==
- Great Celebrations square
- Iraqi art
- List of post-Roman triumphal arches
- Lists of war monuments and memorials
- Military Trophy Park (Baku)
