= Faeq Hassan =

Iraqi artist (1914–1992)

- فائق حسن
- Born: 1914; Baghdad
- Died: 1992 (aged 77–78)
- Occupations: Artist - painter and sculptor
- Movement: Al-Ruwad (The Pioneers)

Faeq Hassan (also known as Faiq Hassan, Fayiq Hassan or Faik Hassan) (1914–1992) was an Iraqi painter noted for founding several 20th-century art groups, which collectively were responsible for bridging the gap between Iraqi heritage and traditional art and modern art. He is often called the 'father of Iraqi modern art.'

== Life and career ==
Hassan was born in Baghdad in 1914 into a poor family. His father had died before the infant, Hassan, was born. As a child, he helped his mother who made folkloric clay statues of Arab Bedouins and local farmers. As a young boy, he visited his uncle who was working as a gardener for King Faisal I where the King saw the boy drawing a horse. Recognising his talent, the King promised to give the young artist a scholarship. However, the King died in 1933 before he could carry out his promise.

During the early 1930s, Hassan gave art lessons at a local school, and when the new King Faisal II visited his school, he ordered that Hassan be sent to Paris to study art, thus fulfilling his father's earlier promise to the young boy. Hassan was also allocated a private French tutor so that he could learn French prior to his departure. He graduated from the École des Beaux-Arts, Paris in 1938. Hassan was one a very small group of artists sent to study abroad. On their return to Iraq, this group became the cornerstone of modern art in Iraq.

On his return to Baghdad, Hassan founded the Painting Department at the Fine Arts Institute in 1939-1940 in conjunction with his friend, artist and sculptor, Jawad Saleem. He also founded the Al-Ruwad (The Pioneers Group), in the 1930s and was its President for many years. The group attempted to incorporate local phenomena into art. They rejected the artificial atmosphere of the artist's studio and encouraged artists to engage with nature and traditional Iraqi life and held their first exhibition in 1931. This group was responsible for taking the first steps towards bridging the gap between modernity and heritage. Artists active in this group, like Hassan, had been educated abroad, returned with a European aesthetic, yet wanted to paint local scenes and landscapes. Members included: Jawad Saleem, Ismail al Sheikhli, Kamil Chadirji, Mohammed Ghani Hikmat and Nadhim Ramzi.

In 1950, Hassan established the Avantgarde Group (also known as the Primitive Group or the Societe Primitive); a group of local artists that attempted to incorporate local phenomena into art. Inspired by Mespotamian art and Iraqi folklore, the group was led by Hassan along with artist, Isma'il al-Shaykhali (Turkey b. 1927). This group was inspired by the 13th-century Baghdad School.

In 1962, he founded the al-Zawiya (the Corners Group) with the objective of using art to focus on social and political issues, and serve national interests.

For most of his working life, he was a member of the Iraqi Artists' Society. He died in 1992 from heart failure.

== Work ==
Hassan was a highly experimental painter. At different times, he explored the visual possibilities of Cubism, Impressionism and Abstract art, amongst other genres. As an art student, he had been heavily influenced by impressionism, but as he matured his work became more and more abstract. However, from a commercial standpoint, he found that impressionist works were popular and sold well. He accordingly returned again and again to that style.

Hassan participated in exhibitions until 1967; including the first exhibition of his newly formed Corner Groups. He also took part in the Friends of Art Society in 1943 and 1946.

=== Select list of artworks ===
- The Tent, oil on wood, 80 X 90 cm, 1956
- Celebration of Victory, mosaic mural, public work, Tiran Square, Baghdad, 1967
- The History of Iraq, oil on canvas, triptych, 186.5 x 300 cm (per panel), c. 1970
- Village Life, oil on canvas, 1971
- A Horseman, oil on canvas, 1980s
- Two Men, oil on canvas, date unknown
- Abstract Couple, oil on canvas, date unknown
- The Groom, oil on canvas, date unknown

=== Exhibitions ===
- Participated in the Avicenna Exhibition in Baghdad in 1952.
- Organized a number of one-man exhibitions in Baghdad, in 1962-1967 and 1971.
- Participated in most national exhibitions outside Iraq.
- Joined nine artists in the Iraq Art Exhibition in Beirut in 1965.

== See also ==
- Iraqi art
- Islamic art
- List of Iraqi artists
- Fathi Safwat Kirdar
