= Inaam Kachachi =

Iraqi journalist and author

- Born: 1 January 1952 (age 74); Baghdad, Iraq
- Education: University of Baghdad
- Occupations: Activist, Author, Journalist and Documentarist

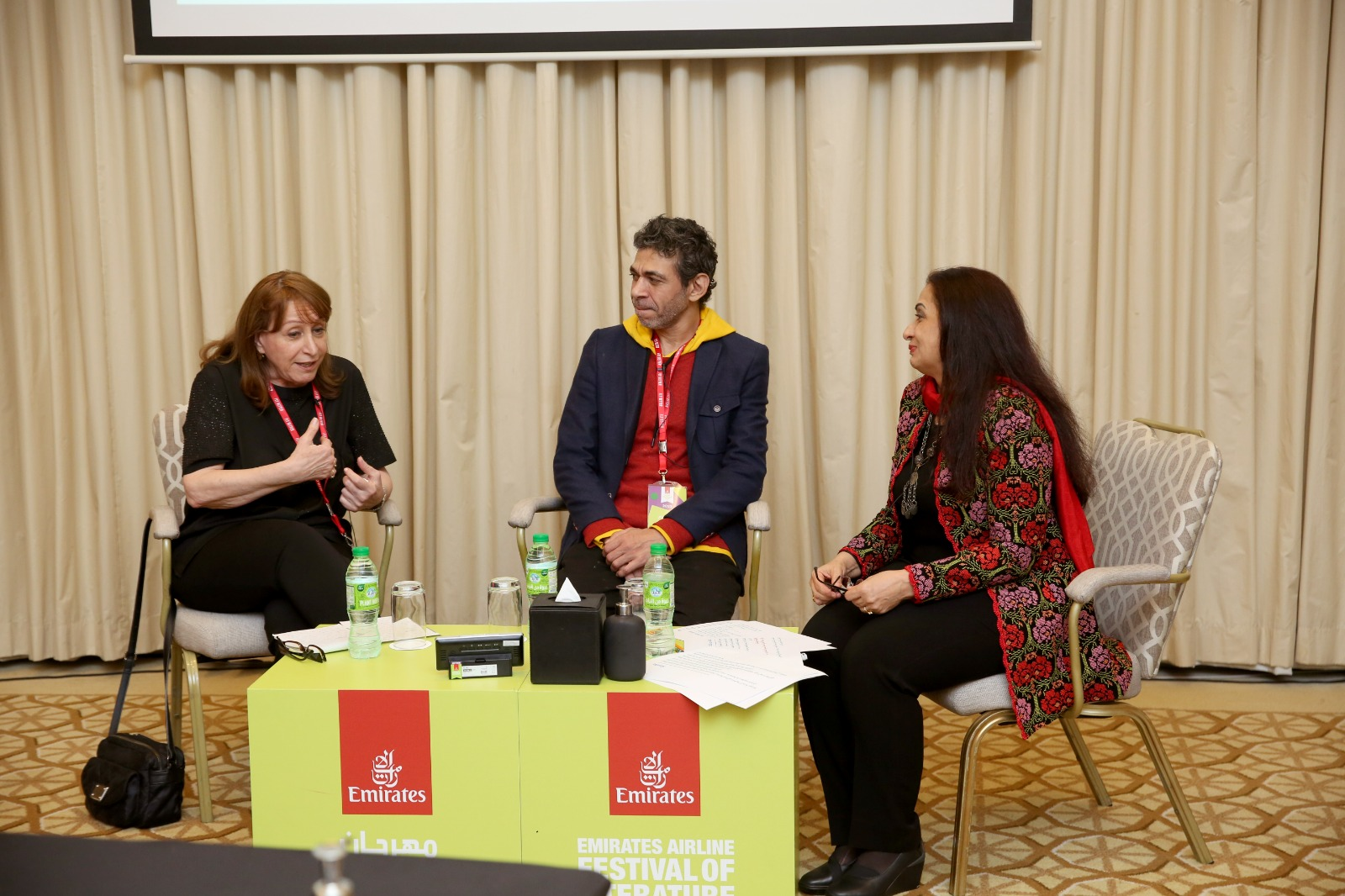

Inaam Kachachi (Arabic:انعام كجه جي; born 1952) is an Iraqi journalist and author. She studied journalism at Baghdad University, working in Iraqi press and radio before moving to Paris to complete a PhD at the Sorbonne. She is currently the Paris correspondent for London-based newspaper Asharq Al-Awsat and Kol Al-Usra magazine in Sharjah, UAE. Kachachi has published a biography, Lorna, about the British journalist Lorna Hales, who was married to the famous pioneering Iraqi sculptor Jawad Salim, and a book in French about Iraqi women's literature produced in times of war. She produced and directed a documentary about Naziha Al Dulaimi, the first woman to become minister of an Arab country, in 1959. Her first novel Heart Springs appeared in 2005 and her second novel The American Granddaughter, was shortlisted for IPAF in 2009. An English translation of the novel was published by Bloomsbury Qatar Foundation Publishing in 2010.

== Life and career ==
She was born in Baghdad and studied journalism at university. She worked as a journalist in both print media and radio before moving to France in 1979. She went on to obtain a PhD in Paris. She still lives and works in Paris, and is the local correspondent for a couple of Arabic-language newspapers.

== Work ==
In 2004, Kachachi made a documentary on Naziha Al Dulaimi, the first female cabinet minister in the Arab world. She has also published several fiction and non-fiction titles. These are:

- Lorna, her years with Jawad Selim (Beirut, 1998) (non-fiction)
- Paroles d’Irakiennes (Paris, 2003) (non-fiction)
- Sawaqi al-Quloob (Streams of Hearts, 2005) (novel)
- Al-Hafeeda al-Amreekiya (The American Granddaughter, 2008) (novel; translated into English by Nariman Youssef)
- Tashari (2013)
- Annabitha, (the outcast), 2017, has been shortlisted for the 2018 International Prize for Arabic Fiction.

Kachachi's second novel The American Granddaughter was nominated for the Arabic Booker Prize. Tashari was shortlisted for the International Prize for Arabic Fiction (2014).

== Films ==
- Al Manshour Al Alani(Openly published), Baghdad, 1975.
- Lena, an Iraqi in LA, Los Angeles, 2004, a 10 minutes documentary film, about the participation of women in the first election after the American invasion.
- Naziha Al Dulaimi, Potsdam, 2004, a 30 minutes documentary film about, the Iraqi woman doctor who, in 1959, was the first woman to become a minister in an Arab country. Then she was exiled in Germany.
- Mahjoub, Cairo and Beirut, 2016, a 60 minutes documentary film about the Copte doctor who was a militant for peace, who was also a poet and a writer for young readers.

== See also ==
- Jawad Saleem
- Lorna Selim
