= Saving Iraqi Culture =

Monument in Baghdad

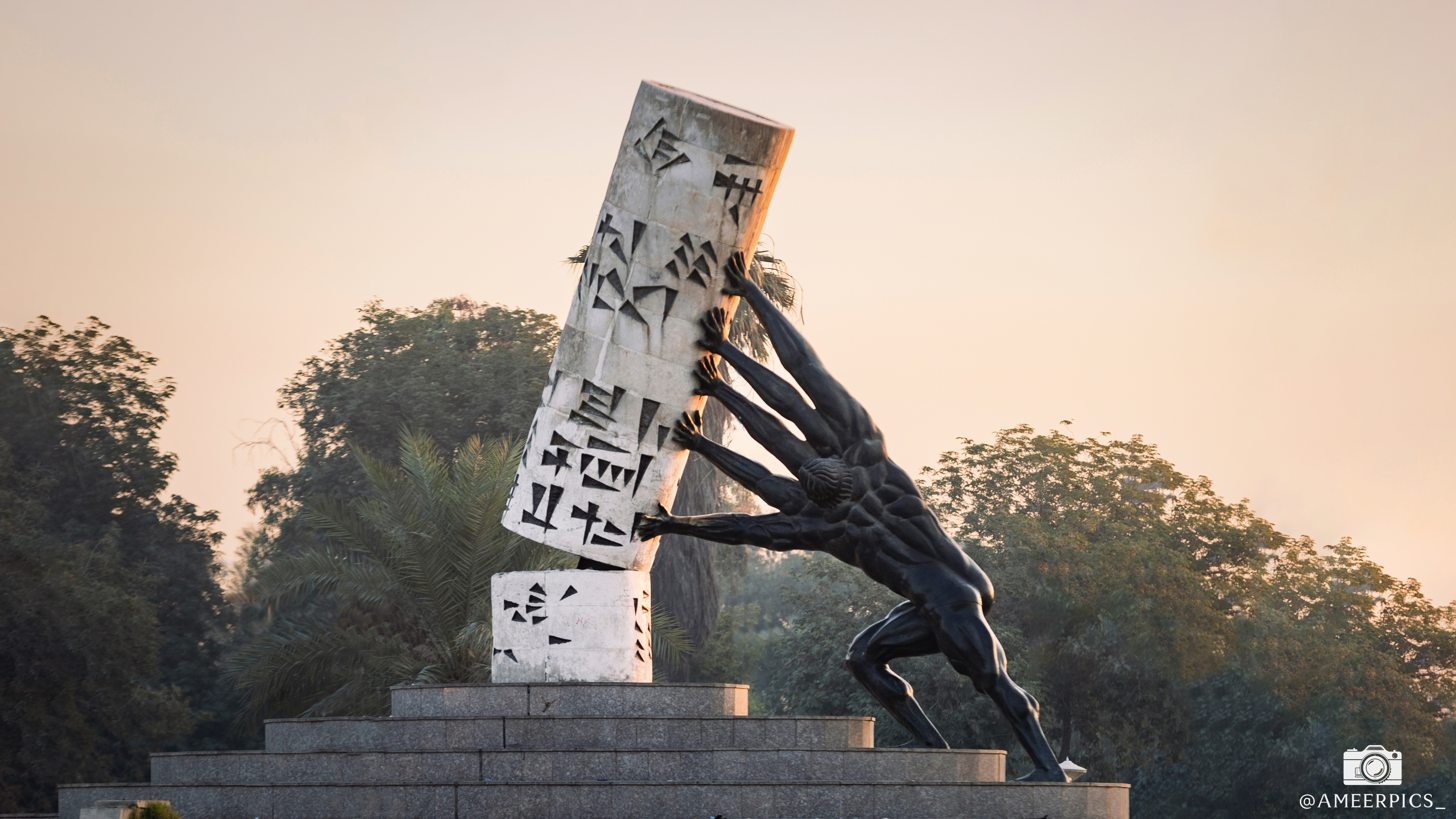
- Interactive map of the Saving Iraqi Culture area

General information
- Type: Monument, sculpture
- Location: Baghdad, Iraq
- Coordinates: 33°18′54″N 44°22′03″E

Design and construction
- Architect: Mohammed Ghani Hikmat

Saving Iraqi culture (Arabic: نصب انقاذ الثقافة, romanized: Nasb Enqath al-Thaqafa) is a monument located in the Mansour district of Baghdad. It was designed by Iraqi sculptor Mohammed Ghani Hikmat. The monument shows a broken cylinder seal, with hands and arms attempting to support it so as not to fall. The cuneiform on the seal reads writing began here.

== Background ==
In 2010, the Secretary of Baghdad commissioned Mohammed Ghani Hikmat, renowned as the "Sheikh of Sculptors," to complete a series of four projects as part of Baghdad's cultural program. The artist embarked on creating four new sculptures to be installed in various locations across the Iraqi capital. However, this initiative was his final artistic endeavor, as Hikmat died before its completion; his son oversaw the project's fulfillment.

The four works seamlessly blended traditional Iraqi heritage with modern artistic expression.

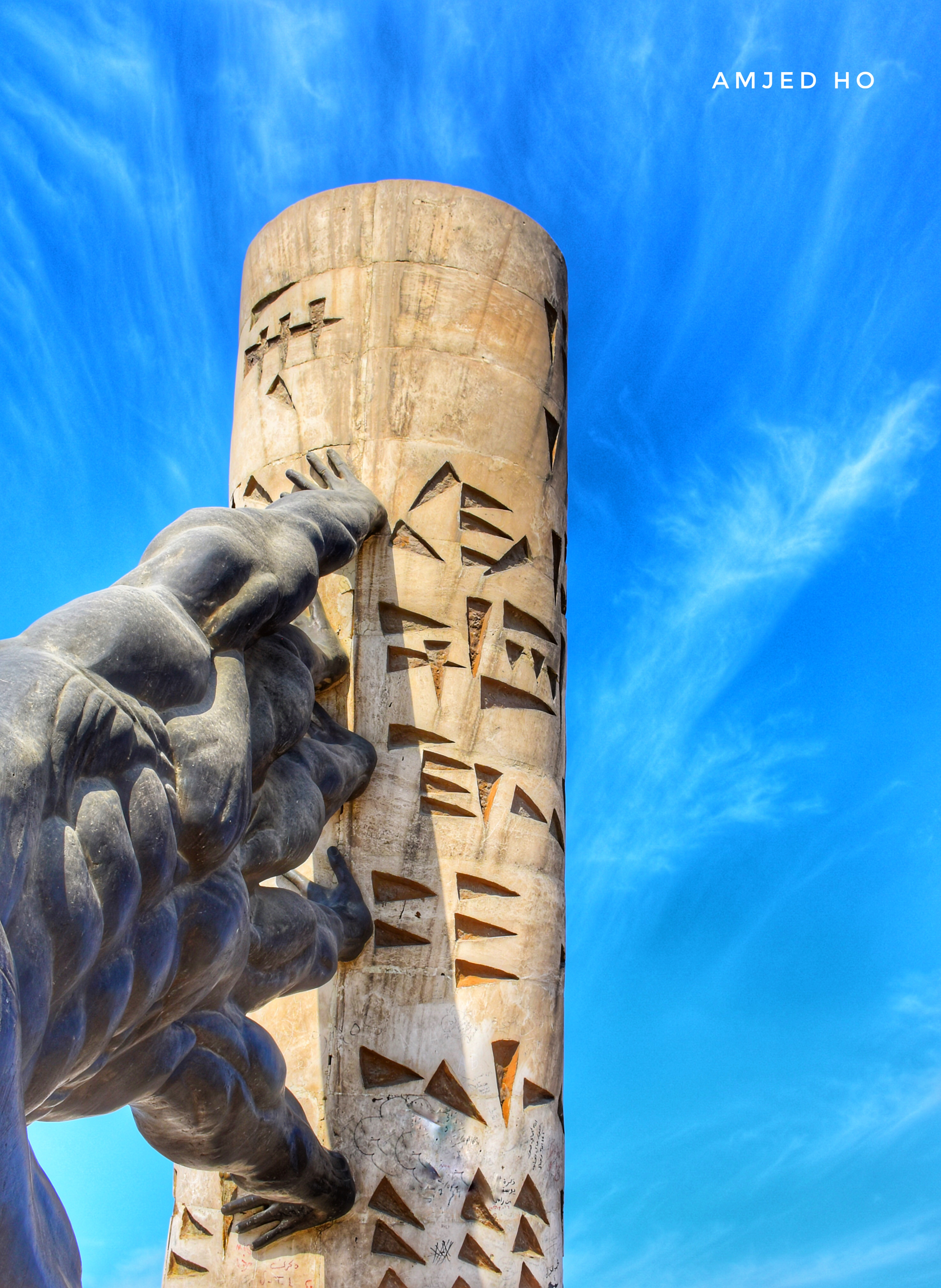
Close-Up Monument

The first of the projects to be completed was The Magic Lantern, inaugurated in 2011. The remaining three works—Baghdad's Poems, a fountain adorned with Arabic calligraphy; Baghdad Column, a pillar portraying the city as a beautiful woman dressed in traditional Abbasid attire; and The Rescue of Culture, featuring a Sumerian cylinder seal held by an Iraqi citizen—were all unveiled in 2013.

Muhammad Ghani Hikmat was renowned for his public artworks, which now adorn various corners of Baghdad. His portfolio also includes smaller wooden sculptures that depict the daily life of Baghdad's people. Among his most famous creations are the statues of Queen Scheherazade and King Shahryar, situated along the banks of the Tigris River near Abu Nuwas Street, and the Kahramana Fountain on Al-Saadoun Street.

The placement of his works was of great importance to the artist, who sought to make his sculptures accessible to everyone. Rather than opting for squares or public gardens, Hikmat chose to position his creations along streets and on the sides of buildings, ensuring their integration into the fabric of daily urban life.
