= Miran al-Saadi =

- ميران السعدي
- Born: 1934; Baghdad, Iraq
- Died: 1993 (aged 59); Baghdad, Iraq
- Education: Baghdad Institute of Fine Arts (1955); Accademia Reale, Rome (1961)
- Known for: Sculpture

Miran al-Saadi (1934–1993) was an Iraqi sculptor noted for producing monumental works for Baghdad's public spaces and for developing "in the field sculpture."

== Life and career ==
Born 1934 in Baghdad, he graduated from the Baghdad Institute of Fine Arts in 1955. In the early 1960s, he was part of a group of Iraqi artists including Sadiq Rabie and Ismail Fatah Al Turk, Qasim al-Azzawi and Ghazi Saudi, who studied in Rome. He graduated in 1961.

Al-Saadi's career coincided with a particularly turbulent period of Iraqi history. Shortly after his return to Baghdad, the reigning monarch was murdered, the monarchy abolished and a republic was established. Many artists fled Iraq at this time, however, al-Nasiri and a small group of eminent local artists, including Ismail Fatah Al Turk, Mohammed Ghani Hikmat and Khaled al-Rahal, remained in Baghdad.

The Ba'ath party became an important patron of the arts, and encouraged local visual artists to demonstrate a cultural connection between modern Iraqi people and ancient Sumerian peoples. Artists who were prepared to work within the Ba'athist agenda flourished, were awarded scholarships and given lucrative positions at the Ministry of Culture. Sculptors, in particular, benefited from a Ba'athist program to beautify the city of Baghdad with public monuments and statues. From the mid 1960s and throughout the 1970s, al-Saadi was commissioned to provide works that contributed to a sense of national identity while at the same time referencing Iraq's ancient art heritage.

His two most important sculptures are the Eagle Monument and the Statue of Antarah ibn Shaddad (pictured), both now located in public spaces in the city of Baghdad. He is also noted for developing "in the field sculpture."

Al-Saadi died in 1993, at the age of 59.

== Major public works ==
- Al-Jaraar Monument

Dimension: 6 metres (height)
Completed: 1969
Location: Alawi, Baghdad
Description: Depicts a collection of popular jars from Iraq's history to the present, arranged in a conical structure.

- The Eagle Monument

Dimensions: Unknown
Materials: Bronze
Completed: Commenced in 1965 and completed in 1969
Location: Nisour Square, Yarmouk, (near Al-Kheir Bridge in Karkh), Baghdad
Description: Represents two faces of falconers in a split sphere with eagles sitting on top. Almost certainly influenced by the split sphere design of the Martyr's Monument, also in Baghdad, by Ismail Fatah Al Turk, the Eagle Monument symbolises the Iraqi pilots who fought in the war as well as Iraq's soaring ambition from its ancient past to the present day. It is erected at the location where an Iraqi pilot landed after have been shot down in 1963. The monument was scheduled for destruction in the post-2003 period due to its close association with the Ba'ath Party, however, this proposal met with substantial public resistance and has been saved from demolition, at least, for the time being.

- Statue of Badr Shaker Sayyab

Dimensions: 2.5 metres (approx., excluding base)
Materials: Bronze
Completed: 1971
Location: Basra
Description: Depicts the Iraqi poet, Badr Shakir al-Sayyab and is erected near the poet's former home in Basra

- Statue of Antarah ibn Shaddad

Dimensions: Unknown
Completed: 1972
Location: Antar Square, Adhamiya
Description: Depicts a pre-Islamic Arabian poet and knight, Antarah ibn Shaddad mounted on horseback.

== See also ==
- Hurufiyya movement
- List of Iraqi artists
- Iraqi art
