= Timthal Baghdad =

- تمثال بغداد
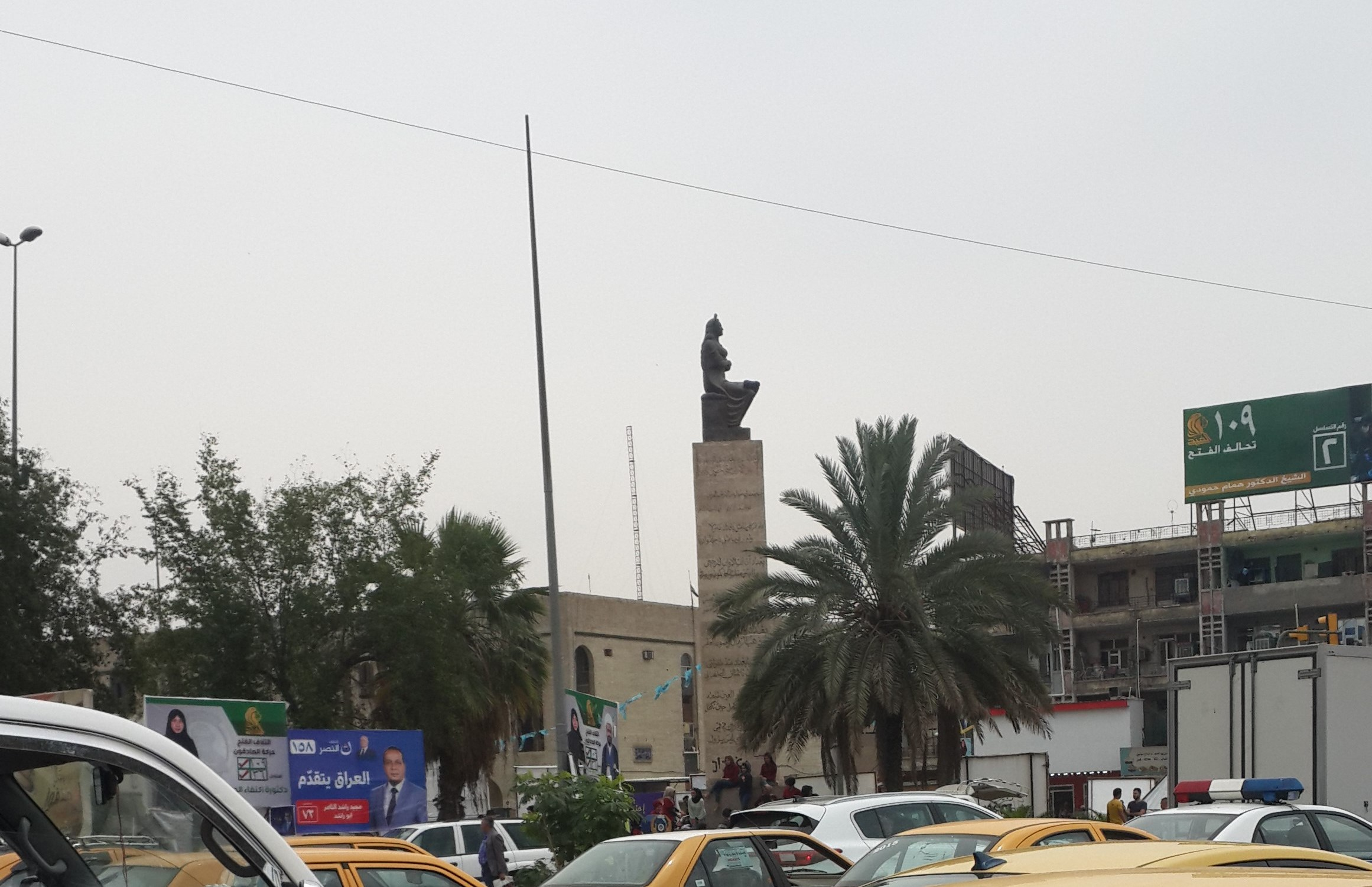
- Timthal Baghdad ('Baghdad's Statue')
- Interactive map of Timthal Baghdad
- Location: Al-Andalus Square, Baghdad
- Coordinates: 33°18′57″N 44°25′35″E
- Designer: Mohammed Ghani Hikmat
- Material: Stone and bronze
- Height: 13.5 m
- Beginning date: 2010
- Completion date: 2013
- Dedicated to: Baghdad

Timthal Baghdad ('Baghdad's Statue') is a public monument in Baghdad, created by the sculptor Mohammed Ghani Hikmat (1929–2011) and inaugurated in 2013. It is a tall column with a woman dressed in Abbasid costume sitting on the top. The column is inscribed with Arabic letters, taken from a famous Arabic poem by the eminent poet Mustafa Jamal al-Din. The statue is intended to glorify both the city and its ancient heritage.

== Background ==
In 2010, the Mayor of Baghdad commissioned the sculptor, Mohammed Ghani Hikmat, to complete a series of four monuments as part of a Baghdad Culture program. The artist began work on four new sculptures to be erected in various locations around Baghdad. However, this would be his final project, for the sculptor died before it was completed. Ghani's son oversaw the completion of the project. All four works blended Iraqi tradition with modern techniques and materials.

The first to be completed was Al Fanous El Sehri ('Magic Lantern'), inaugurated in 2011. The remaining three works, Ashaar Baghdad ('Baghdad's Poetry', a fountain featuring Arabic script), Timthal Baghdad ('Baghdad's Statue', a column featuring the city as a beautiful girl wearing traditional Abbasid costume), and Enkath El Iraq ('Saving Iraq's Culture', a Sumerian cylindrical seal in the hands of an Iraqi citizen) were all inaugurated in 2013.

Mohammed Ghani Hikmat was known for his public works, now on display throughout Baghdad's urban spaces, and also for smaller statues carved in wood, depicting the everyday life of Baghdad's people. His most well-known works include a pair of statues of Queen Scheherazade and King Shahryar, located on the banks of the Tigris River, near Abu Nuwas Street and the Fountain of Kahramana in Baghdad's central business district. The choice of location for his works was important to Ghani, who wanted the sculptures to be accessible to all. He avoided public squares and gardens, and instead wanted his works to be situated in the streets and on the sides of buildings.

== Description ==
The first of the three sculptures inaugurated in 2013 was Timthal Baghdad ('Baghdad’s Statue'). It is a column featuring a lady sitting on a chair wearing Abbasid traditional clothes and is located in Andalusia square (Al Andalus). The overall height of the column is 13.5 metres (10.5 metre base and 3 metres for the figure), making it one of the tallest monuments in the city centre.

The column features Arabic calligraphy along its length, specifically poetry by Mustafa Jamal al-Din glorifying the city of Baghdad. The verse reads in part:

Baghdad, what did you do?

Only let your green window shine

You passed the world and your morning is sunny

And I will judge you, and your night will be moonlit

The figure of the Abbasid woman is reclining, with her back to the sun, so that she is looking towards the horizon in front of her. The woman is intended to signify that the country's ancestors were from the East. This reference is another reference objectively tied to the base of the monument.

=== Specifications ===
- Monument name: Timthal Baghdad ('Baghdad's Statue')
- Monument type: Column
- Materials: Stone and bronze
- Height: 3m plus 10.5m base (Total= 13.5 m)
- Location: Andalus Square, Baghdad
- Date constructed: 2010–2013
- Official inauguration: 2013 (pictured)
- Designer and builder: Mohammed Ghani Hikmat

== See also ==
- Iraqi art
- Hurufiyya movement
