= Freedom Monument (Baghdad) =

Monument in Baghdad, Iraq

- نصب الحرية
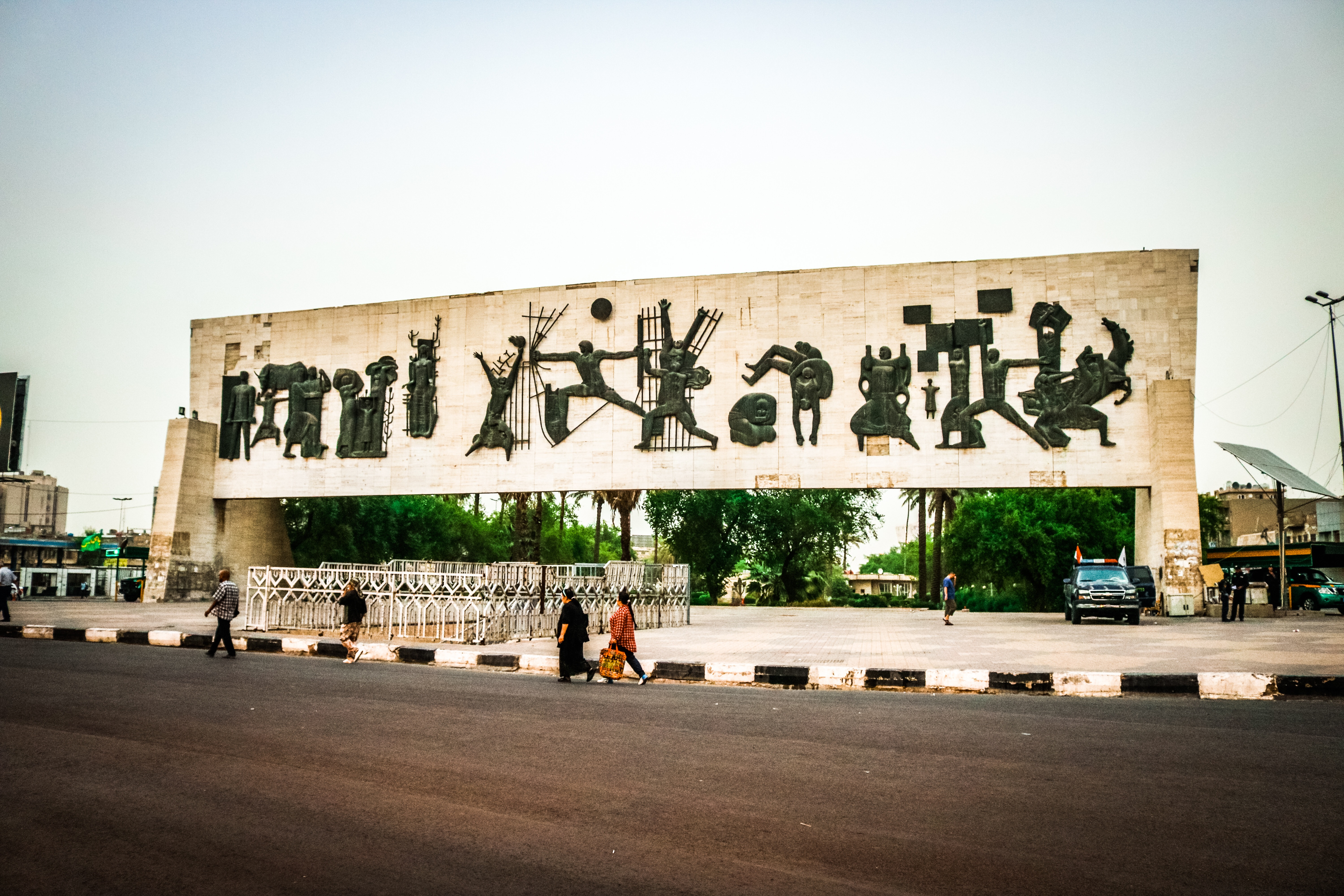
- Interactive map of Freedom Monument
- Location: Liberation Square, Bab Al-Sharqi
- Designer: Jawad Saleem
- Material: Concrete, Bronze
- Length: 50 metres
- Height: 10 metres
- Beginning date: 1958
- Completion date: 1961

Freedom Monument (or Nasb al-Hurriyah) (Arabic: نصب الحرية), located in al-Tahrir Square (Liberation Square) in the center of Baghdad, capital of Iraq, is a monument commemorating Iraq's declaration of independence. The monument was the work of husband and wife sculptors Jawad Saleem and Lorna Selim. It consists of bronze figures on a travertine wall, and depicts events from the 14 July Revolution. The bas-relief figures consciously reference ancient Mesopotamian art.

== Historical background ==
In 1959 the new leader of the Iraqi republic, Brigadier General Abd al-Karim Qasim commissioned a monument that would be a celebration of Iraq's declaration of independence. It was to be situated in the heart of Baghdad's central business district, overlooking al-Tahrir Square and al-Jumhuriya Bridge. He approached the architect Rifat Chadirji, one of Iraqi's leading architects. He developed an idea with Jawad Saleem, who was well known for works that integrated Iraq's ancient history with contemporary themes and techniques. The Brigadier General wanted it to be a symbol of a new nation state, however, Jawad Saleem chose to design a monument symbolizing the people's strife against tyranny and paid homage to Iraq's deep art history by including Abbasid and Babylonian wall-reliefs, producing a sculpture that was both "strikingly modern" yet also referenced tradition.

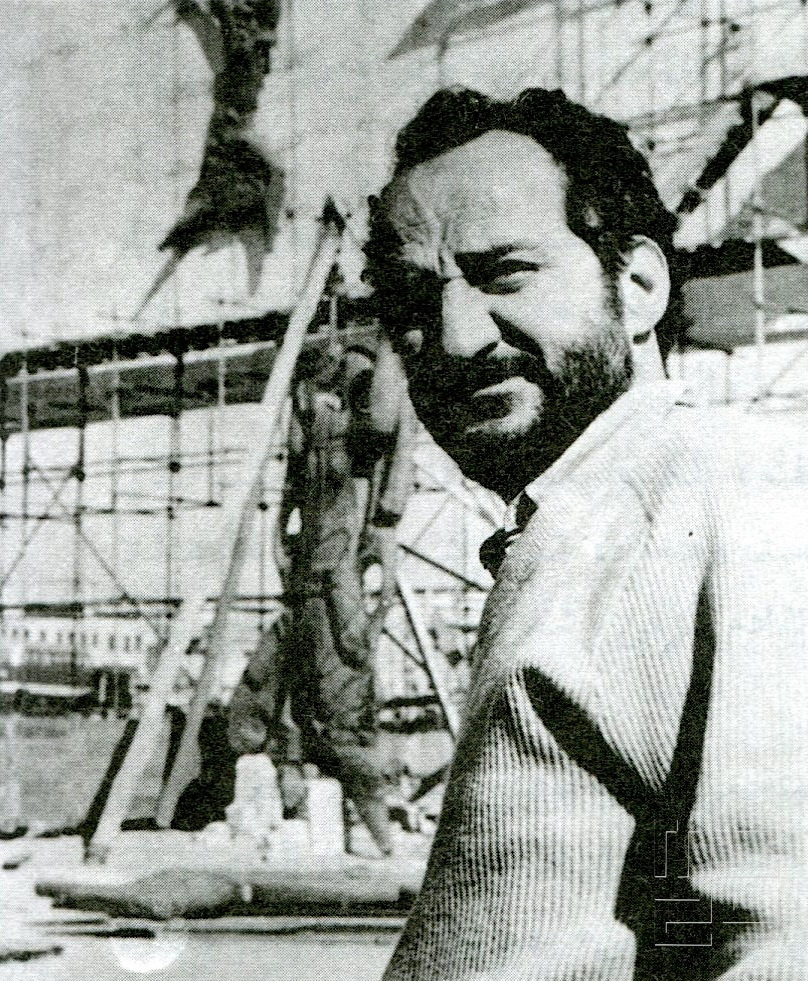
Jawad Saleem in front of Nasb al-Hurriyah while under construction.

Saleem labored on the project under difficult conditions, resisting all attempts by Qasim to have his image incorporated into the monument. Initially, Saleem had wanted the sculpture to be at ground level, but the project architect, Rifa'at Chadirchi, insisted that it be elevated so that it would look more 'monumental'. As a result, the completed work faces the busy traffic rather than people walking in the adjacent gardens.

Although the monument was Saleem's design, he did not see the project through to completion. Following his premature death in January, 1961, the project was finalised in 1961 by the sculptor's wife; artist, Lorna Saleem, along with Saleem's friend and colleague, sculptor, Mohammed Ghani Hikmat, who had previously been assisting on the project by casting the bronze figures. The completed monument, known as Nasb al-Hurriyah (Monument of Freedom), has survived various attempts to have it pulled down and is one of Baghdad's most iconic public works.

== Description ==
The monument was opened in 1961, after the sculptor's death. It consists of 14 bronze castings, representing 25 figures, on a travertine slab, raised 6 metres off the ground. The monument is 10 metres in height and 50 metres long. The figures, which are in bas-relief, are intended to evoke Babylonian, Assyrian and Arab artworks.

It depicts historic Iraqi events up to the 14 July Revolution led by Abdul Karim Qasim; a key date which marks the beginning of Republican rule in Iraq.

The monument is intended to be read as a verse of Arabic poetry - from right to left - beginning with events that preceded the revolution - and concluding with harmony following independence. The multiple references and hidden layers of meaning in the work inspired Arab artists across the region and encouraged them to pursue artwork with a national identity at a time when many Arab nations were attaining independence.

== Legacy ==
The sculpture featured on the 250 Dinar bank-note in 1995 and the 10,000 dinar bank note for 2013–2015 in honour of the sculptor.

== See also ==
- Al-Shaheed Monument
- Iraqi art
- The Monument to the Unknown Soldier
- Victory Arch
- Save Iraqi culture monument
