= Mohammed Ghani Hikmat =

Iraqi sculptor and artist

- محمد غني حكمت
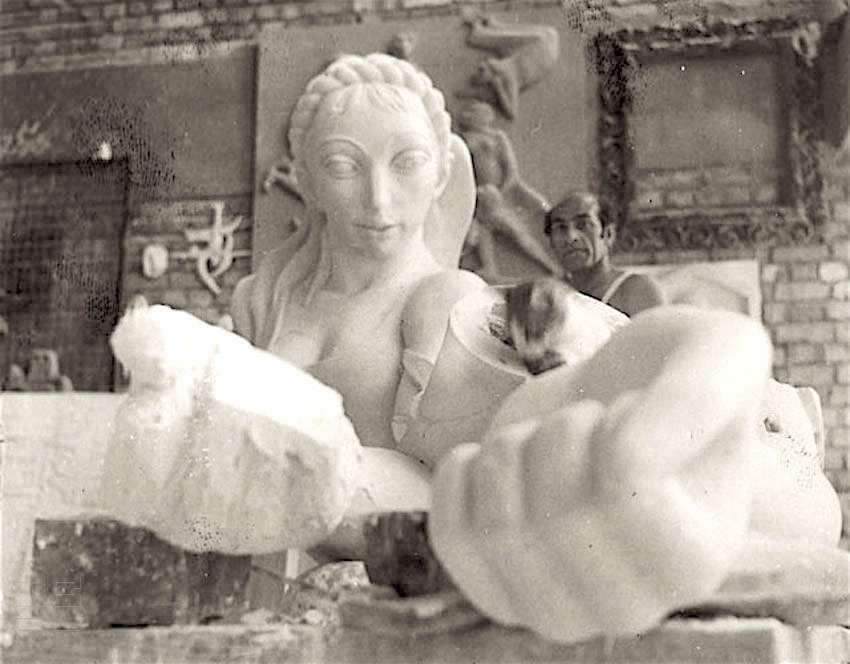
- Ghani working on his sculpture "Kahramana" in 1969
- Born: April 20, 1929; Kadhimiya, Baghdad, Iraq
- Died: September 12, 2011 (aged 82); Amman, Jordan
- Education: Institute of Fine Arts (Baghdad); Academy of Fine Arts, Rome
- Occupations: Sculptor, artist
- Movement: Pioneers Group
- Spouse: Gaya al-Rahal
- Website: Mohammed Ghani official website

Mohammad Ghani Hikmat (April 20, 1929 – September 12, 2011) (Arabic: محمد غني حكمت) was an Iraqi sculptor and artist credited with creating some of Baghdad's highest-profile sculptures and monuments and was known as the "sheik of sculptors". He is also known as an early member of Iraq's first 20th-century art groups, including Al-Ruwad (the Pioneers) and The Baghdad Modern Art Group; two groups that helped to bridge the gap between tradition and modern art. He was also instrumental in recovering many of Iraq's missing artworks, which were looted following the 2003 invasion.

== Life and career ==
Ghani was born in 1929 in the Kadhimiya neighbourhood of Baghdad. As a young boy, he liked to mould objects out of clay that he found in his surroundings and his talent was soon noticed.

He graduated from the Fine Arts Institute in Baghdad in 1953, before completing his studies in 1957 at the Academy of Fine Arts in Rome, Italy. He spent seven years in Italy, where he also studied bronze casting at the Instituto di Zaka in Florence. While in Rome, he sculpted the wooden gates for the Church of Testa di Lepre, becoming the first Muslim sculptor to produce work for the Catholic Church.

On his return to Baghdad in 1961, he found a city that had undergone substantial change. The King had been deposed and killed in a military coup in July 1958, and several coups followed culminating in the rise of the Ba'ath Party in 1968. Ghani continued to work, teaching at the Institute of Fine Arts, the Academy of Fine Arts and at the Department of Architectural Engineering at Baghdad University.

Ghani was very active in Iraq's arts community, especially through his involvement in a number of art groups. He joined Al-Ruwad (The Pioneers), Iraq's first art group, formed by Iraqi painter, Faiq Hassan in the 1930s; the Jama’et Baghdad lil Fen al-Hadith (Baghdad Group for Modern Art) in 1953 and the Al-Zawiya Group (The Corner Group) in 1967. These groups attempted to incorporate local phenomena into their artworks in a variety of ways. The Pioneers group rejected the artificial atmosphere of the artist’s studio and encouraged artists to engage with the local landscape and traditional Iraqi life. The Baghdad Modern Art Group wanted to connect modern art with traditional art of the 13th-century (in the manner of the Baghdad School). The philosophy behind Iraq's early art groups was the desire to connect Iraq's ancient art traditions with international trends in a way that contributed to a truly national Iraqi visual language. Ghani adopted this philosophy by consciously including Assyrian and Babylonian architectural detail, geometric patterns (Arabesque) and Arabic calligraphy in his sculptures. In so doing, artists, like Ghani, helped to synthesise heritage and modernity and to reassert a sense of national identity.

Between 1959 and 1961, Ghani worked as an assistant to his friend, sculptor, Jawad Saleem, on the project to erect the Nasb al-Hurriyah (Monument of Freedom) in Baghdad's Liberation Square (pictured). Ghani's role was to cast the bronze figures for the monument. Following Saleem's premature death in 1961, Ghani assumed responsibility for completing the project. The monument consists of 14 bronze castings, representing 25 figures on a travertine slab, raised 6 metres off the ground. It provides a narrative of the 1958 Revolution of Iraq with references to Iraqi history using Assyrian and Babylonian wall-reliefs. The sculpture featured on the 10,000 dinar bank note for 2013-2015.

From 1958, when the Hashemite monarchy was overthrown and Iraq became a republic, Ghani executed a number of high profile public monuments which are now dotted around the city of Baghdad. Many of Ghani's early sculptures were inspired by Iraqi folklore, especially characters from One Thousand and One Nights (widely known as the Tales of Arabian Nights). His early works were figurative and included statues of Sinbad the Sailor; the 10th-century poet, Al-Mutanabbi; the first Abbasid Caliph, Abu-Ja'afar Mansur (in stone); Hammurabi (in bronze) and Gilgamesh. As he matured, his work became increasingly abstract, but he never lost sight of the need to reference Iraq's ancient art traditions through the use of Arabic script, geometric designs, and Sumerian architectural features.

During the 1980s, he completed one of the gates of the UNICEF building in Paris; the mural of the Great Arab Revolt in Amman and five different works in Bahrain, including a mural in an old mosque, large statues and fountains.

During the 2003 war, and the overthrow of the Ba'ath government, Ghani left Baghdad for Amman in Jordan, where he continued to work. Several years later, following his return to Baghdad, he discovered the Museum of Modern Art in ruins. Some 8,500 paintings and sculptures had been looted. In addition, some 150 artworks had been stolen from Ghani's own studio and public monuments such as his King Sharyhar, located on the banks of the Tigris, had been badly vandalised. The occupying forces insisted on a voluntary return of stolen artworks, a stance which resulted in very few works being returned. A few independent galleries purchased artworks with a view to returning them once a suitable national museum could be established but progress recovering the cultural assets was slow.

In around 2007, Ghani established a committee, the members of which included many respected Iraqi artists, with the objective of recovering stolen artworks. Ghani not only led the committee, but also funded it personally; used his network of connections to secure additional funding and pleaded with private citizens to return artworks that were being held in private collections. By 2010, some 1,500 of the most important works had been returned, and Ghani's committee was directly responsible for recovering 150 of the more important works. In addition, the statue, Motherhood by Jawad Saleem, stolen from Ghani's own studio, was returned.

In media interviews, Ghani often recalled how he was humbled by the generosity of members of the public, who approached him on the streets of Baghdad, wanting to return artworks which they had held in their possession for safekeeping. In one instance, a stranger offered to return two of Ghani's own sculptures which had been purchased on the black market, hoping that one day they would be returned to the Museum. In 2010, the Mayor of Baghdad commissioned Ghani to complete a series of monuments for the city. The artist began work on four new sculptures to be erected in various locations around Baghdad. However, this would be his final project, for the sculptor died before it was completed. Ghani's son oversaw the completion of the project. The new works would include Ashaar Baghdad (Baghdad's Poetry) a fountain featuring bronze calligraphy from a poem by Mustafa Jamal al-Din; Enkath El Iraq (Save Iraq), a Sumerian cylindrical seal in the hands of an Iraqi citizen; Al Fanous El Sehri (Magic Lantern), a fountain featuring the lamp from One Thousand and One Nights, and Timthal Baghdad, (Baghdad's Statue) a monument featuring the city as a beautiful girl, sitting and wearing traditional Abbasid costume.

Toward the end of his life, hundreds of small and medium-sized sculptures could be found in and around Baghdad's public spaces. In addition, he produced some of Baghdad's most loved large public works. In his homeland, he was known as the "sheik of sculptors." Mohammed Ghani Hikmat died in Amman, Jordan, where he was receiving medical treatment, on September 12, 2011, at the age of 82. He was survived by his wife, Gaya al-Rahal; a son, Yaser Mohammed and a daughter, Hajeer Mohammed Ghani.

== Work ==
He is known for his public works, now on display throughout Baghdad's urban spaces, and also for smaller statues carved in wood, depicting the everyday life of Baghdad's people. His most well-known works include a pair of statues of Queen Scheherazade and King Shahryar, located on the banks of the Tigris River, near Abu Nuwas Street and the Fountain of Kahramana in the central business district.

- Queen Scheherazade refers to the heroine from One Thousand and One Nights. She was the beautiful daughter of the royal vizier who volunteered to wed the murderous King Shahryar, who would take a different bride to bed each night, and have them executed before the following dawn. Scheherazade devised an ingenious plan to stave off her execution. Each night she would relate a story that enthralled the King, but she failed to reveal the story's climax until dawn, thus delaying her execution. Through her actions, and after 1001 nights, she was able to transform the King into a more gentle soul. Ghani's statue (pictured) shows her narrating a story to the reclining King.
- Kahramana (pictured) depicts a slave girl, Marjana (or Morgiana), who persuaded thieves, who had come to attack her master, to hide in storage jars. She then pours boiling oil into the jars to kill the thieves.
- Saving Iraqi Culture (pictured) features a multi-handed torso pushing on a scroll bearing ancient cuneiform script, and it was this monument that was featured as a Google Doodle in 2016.
- Timthal Baghdad (or Baghdad's Statue) (pictured) is a 13.5 metre column which features Arabic calligraphy along its length.

Mohammed Ghani Hikmat's final work, Iraq Rises Again, was finished in 2012 (after the sculptor's death). It celebrates the ancestry of Iraq and the collaboration of its multiple ethnic groups in building the country's future. Hikmat is remembered today for his devotion to his people and his beautiful depictions of Iraqi life.

List of notable public and private sculptures

- Carved Wooden Door, timber carving, 1964
- Ali Baba and the Forty Thieves, statue; Hamourabi, the Baghdad Collage of Arts Wall Sculpture, 1969
- Al-Mutanabbi, bronze, 1977, Mutanabbi Street, Baghdad, Iraq. (pictured)
- The Fisherman and the Jinni, fountain, bronze 10m (height), 1982, Green Zone, Baghdad (pictured)
- Kahramana, Fountain; located in Baghdad's bronze, 3.3 metres, Sa'adoon Street, Baghdad, 1971 (pictured)
- Shahriyar and Scheherazade, pair of statues; bronze 4.25 metres, located on the banks of the Tigris River, near Abu Nuwas Street, Baghdad, 1971 (pictured)
- Marble Relief at Madinat al-Tibb (Medical Centre), Baghdad, 1970s
- Great Arab Revolt, mural in Amman, early 2000s
- Victory Arch (also known as the Swords of Qādisīyah), 1989; monument by Ghani with Khaled al-Rahal, Baghdad(pictured)
- Flying Carpets, one carpet is located on the side of a building in Abu Nuwas Street and the other at Baghdad International Airport, date unknown (pictured)
- Al Fanous Al Sihri (Magic Lamp or Lantern), fountain; located in Al-Fateh Square near the National Theatre, Baghdad, inaugurated in 2011 (pictured)
- Nosob Inqath Al Iraq (Saving Iraqi's Culture), statue, height: 10 metres; located in Arabian Knight Square (Al Fares Al Arabi), Al Mansour area, Baghdad, inaugurated in 2013(pictured)
- Timthal Baghdad, (Baghdad's Statue), statue, height: 13.5 metres; located at Al Andalus Square, Baghdad, inaugurated in 2013(pictured)
- Ashaar Baghdad, (Baghdad’s Poetry) fountain, height: 3 metres plus 2 metres base; located in Al Dallal Square, Al Karakh neighbourhood, Baghdad, near the Beiruti Café, inaugurated in 2013 (pictured)

Selected monuments and statues

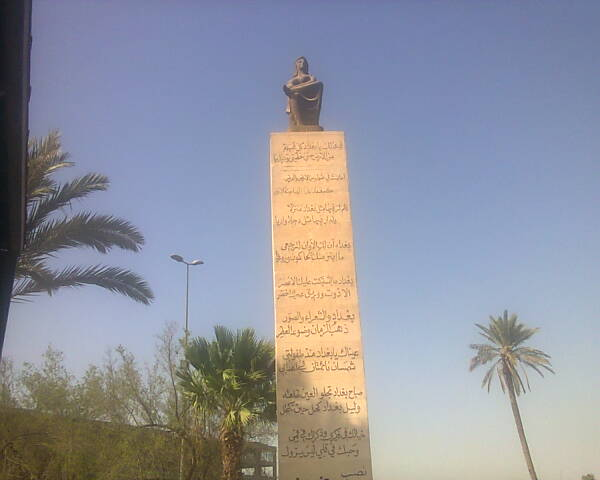
Baghdad's monument in Andalusia Square in central Baghdad

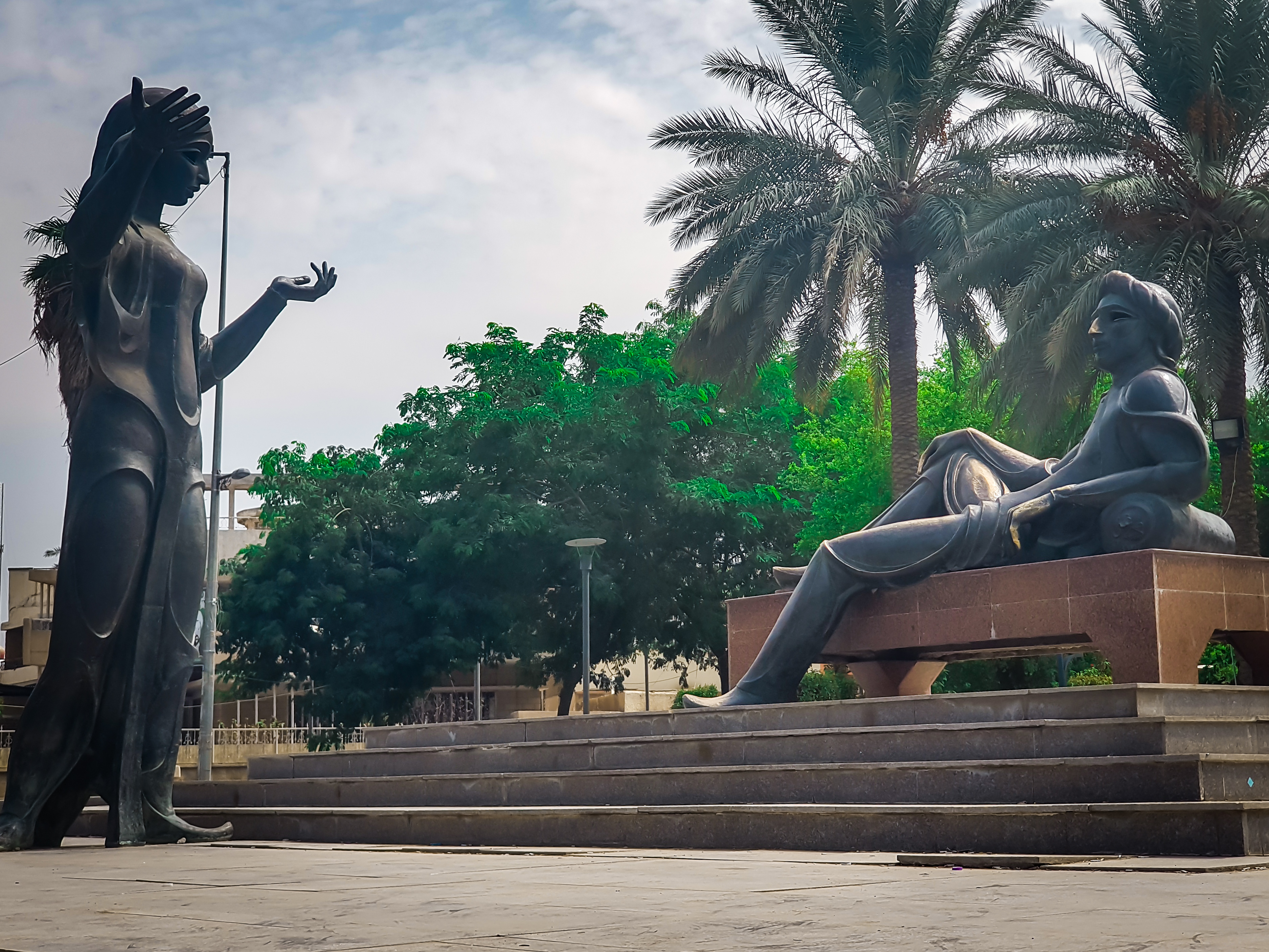
Scheherazade and Shahryar on Abu Nuwas Street, Baghdad

== Legacy ==
In 2015, the 70th Anniversary of the United Nations, the fountain Kahramana was chosen for the World National Heritage. On April 20, 2016, Google dedicated its home page to a Google doodle for Mohammed Ghani Hikmat with one of his famous monuments located in Baghdad: Saving The Iraqi Culture.

== See also ==
- Iraqi art
- Islamic art
- Hurufiyya movement
- List of Iraqi artists
