= Lorna Selim =

English artist and art teacher (1928–2021)

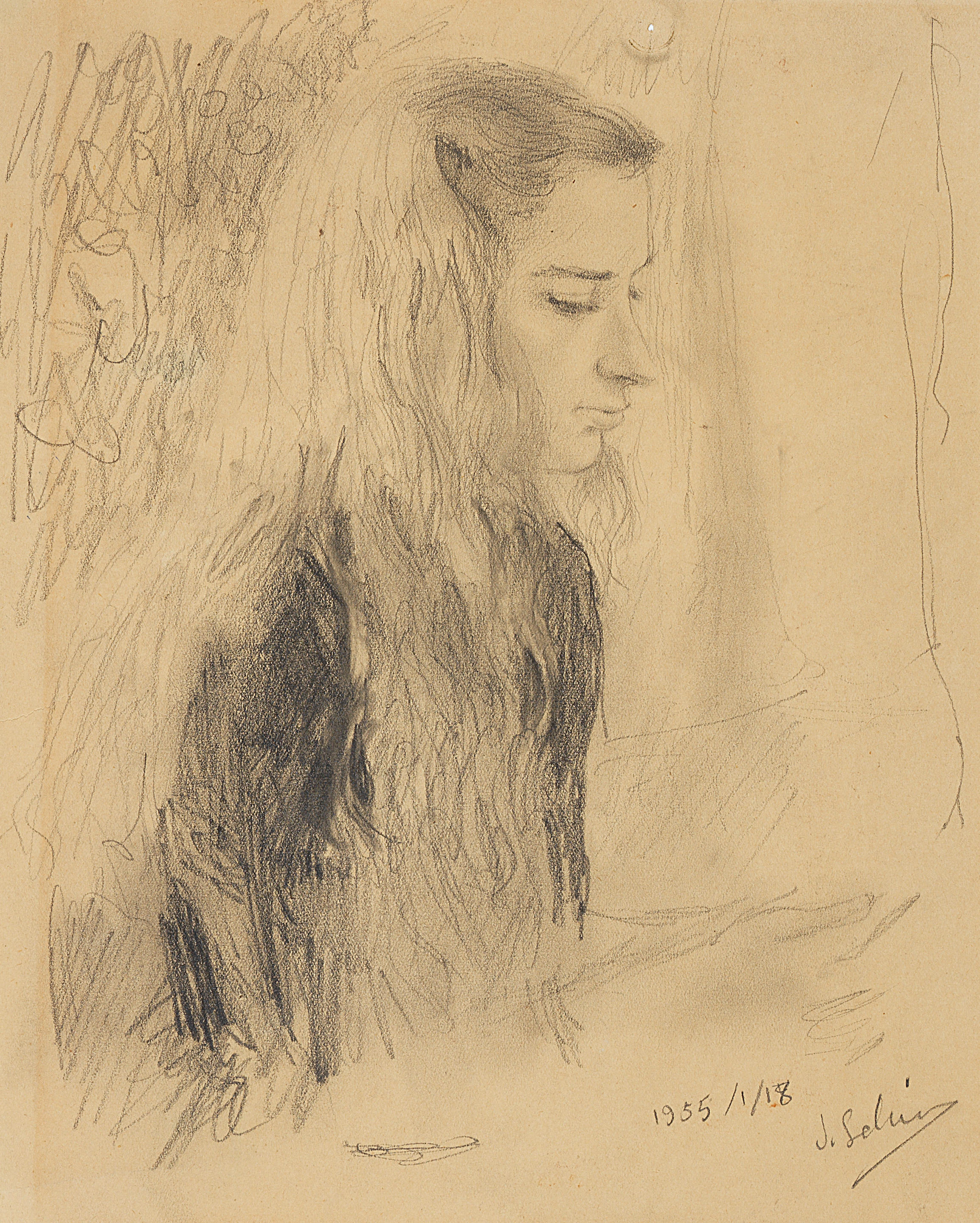
- Portrait by Jewad Selim, 1955
- Born: 1928; Sheffield, England
- Died: 23 January 2021 (aged 92–93); Wales
- Education: Slade School of Fine Art (1945–1948); London University Institute of Education (1949)
- Known for: Painter and educator
- Spouse: Jewad Selim

Lorna Beryl Selim (1928 – 23 January 2021) was an English artist and art teacher, who married prominent Iraqi sculptor Jewad Selim, relocating to Baghdad with him in 1950. She was a practising artist for much of her life up until her death. Selim contributed to the arts community in Iraq through her exhibitions, teaching and active participation in arts groups for twenty years. After her husband's premature death in 1961, she was part of the team responsible for completing his iconic monumental work, entitled Nasb al-Hurriyah.

== Life and career ==
Although Lorna Selim was well known as the English wife of the prominent Iraqi sculptor, Jewad Selim, Selim was also a capable and influential artist in her own right. She is consistently listed as an Iraqi artist from the pioneer generation.

Born in Sheffield in 1928, Lorna received a scholarship and used it to study at the Slade School of Fine Arts, London, graduating with a Diploma in Painting and Design in 1948. It was here that she met the Iraqi artist and sculptor, Jewad Selim, who was also studying at the Slade School. In 1949 she received an Art Teachers' Diploma from the London University Institute of Education.

From 1949 to 1950 she taught art at the Tapton House Grammar School, Chesterfield. In September 1950 Lorna left Sheffield to join Jewad in Baghdad, Iraq and they were married a week later. An Iraqi art critic noted that:

"Lorna came to Iraq and saw beauty where none of the rest of us had noticed it before. Other artists began to study the rich artistic tradition which had been under their noses all along. She has had a profound influence."

Selim was fascinated by the traditional Iraqi housing found along the banks of the Tigris—the bayt (houses) and the mudhif (or reed dwelling). Not long after her arrival in Baghdad, the city underwent a period of "modernisation," and many traditional houses were being demolished. She would rush to make sketches of the structures before they were lost permanently. Lorna began by sketching a building then she would return home to start the layout of the painting. She would then return to the building to sketch the finer details and note down the colours. Between 1957 and 1963, she sketched many vernacular buildings and homes.

Lorna Selim was very active in Iraq's arts community through her participation in important arts groups. She became a member of the Society of Iraqi Plastic Artists and the influential The Baghdad Modern Art Group which had been founded by her husband, Jewad Selim and Shakir Hassan Al Said.

Selim exhibited her work in the exhibitions of The Baghdad Modern Art Group. She participated in the Iraqi Pavilion Design for the International Fair held in Damascus in 1954.

Her husband, Jewad Selim, died suddenly in 1961 at the age of 41 years, in the midst of a project to complete a major monumental sculpture, The Freedom Monument, for Baghdad's city centre. Following his death, she, along with Iraqi architect Rifat Chadirji, supervised the completion of the iconic monument. The idea of the monument was conceived and designed by Chadirji and he had asked Jewad to design and execute the making of the bronze relief sculptures that hang on it.

Lorna Selim was a teacher at the Girls' College in 1961 and also taught drawing at Baghdad University's Department of Architecture, headed by Mohamed Makiya, in the 1960s. As an educator, she took her students to sketch structures along the Tigris and was especially interested in exposing young architects to Iraq's vernacular structures, alley-ways and historical monuments. This work helped to inspire a generation of architects to consider including traditional Iraqi design features alongside modern Western architecture in their designs.

Selim continued to paint from her Welsh hillside home in her later life, surrounded by close family (ref: 2018, Miriam Jewad Selim, daughter). Lorna Selim died in Wales on 23 January 2021.

== Work ==
Her work is held in permanent collections including the Mathaf Arab Museum of Modern Art in Doha and elsewhere.

== Legacy ==
Selim is the subject of a non-fiction book by Iraqi journalist, Inaam Kachachi entitled Lorna, Her Years with Jawad Selim published in Arabic by Dar el-Jadid of Beirut in 1998.

== See also ==
- Iraqi art
- List of Iraqi artists
- List of Iraqi women artists
