= Nariman Youssef =

Egyptian translator

Nariman Youssef (Arabic: ناريمان يوسف, romanized: Nārīmān Yūsef; born 1975) is an Egyptian translator and writer.

== Biography ==
Nariman Hassan Youssef was born in 1975. She is the oldest daughter of Egyptian actors Hassan Youssef and Shams al-Baroudi. In 1999, she graduated with a Bachelor of Science in computer science from the American University in Cairo.

She received her master's in translation studies from the University of Edinburgh and was the director of Arabic translation at the British Library. She also has a master's degree from Birkbeck College. Youssef is a doctoral candidate at Manchester University and is affiliated with CASAW.

As a literary translator, Youssef has translated The American Granddaughter by the Iraqi writer Inaam Kachachi. This novel was shortlisted for the 2009 Arabic Booker Prize and the English translation has been published by Bloomsbury Qatar Foundation Publishing. Youssef's translation was praised by Banipal magazine: "Skillfully translated by Nariman Youssef, the English edition of The American Granddaughter is a welcome addition to Arabic literature in translation."

Youssef has also translated poetry by the Omani poet Abdullah al Ryami, among others. In addition, she has written an e-book about the Egyptian revolution under the title Summer of Unrest: Tahrir - 18 Days of Grace. This was released by Vintage Books.

== Works ==
=== Written works ===
- Summer of Unrest: Tahrir - 18 Days of Grace (2011)

=== Translated poetry ===
- Our Old Bed by Abdullah al Ryami
- Please Don't Give Birth! by Abdullah al Ryami
- Balloons by Mostafa Ibrahim
- Nothing of Note by Mostafa Ibrahim
- Beirut39: New Writing from the Arab World (2010) ed. Samuel Shimon
- The Hundred Years' War

=== Translated books ===
- The American Granddaughter by Inaam Kachachi
- Cigarette Number Seven: A Novel (2018) by Donia Kamal
- Off Limits: New Writings on Fear and Sin (2019) by Nawal El Saadawi
- Salt Journals: Tunisian Women on Political Imprisonment (2025) (ed. Haifa Zangana, Christalla Yakinthou, and Virginie Ladisch)
- Mo(a)t: Stories from Arabic (ed. Garen Torikian)

== See also ==
- List of Arabic-English translators
