= Sati' al-Husri =

Ottoman, Syrian writer, educationalist and Arab nationalist

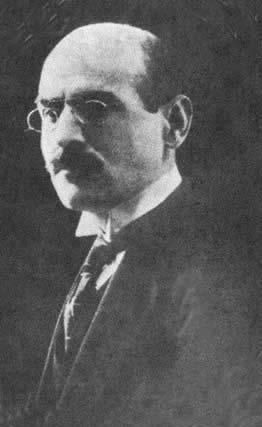
Portrait of Sati al-Husri, 1918-20

Abu Khaldun Sati' al-Husri (Arabic: ساطع الحصري; August 1880 – 1968) was a Syrian intellectual who is mostly recognized for creating the idea of a united Arab nation built on shared language and culture rather than religion.

== Early life ==
Of Syrian descent, al-Husri was born in Sanaa, Yemen, to a government official from a wealthy Arab family from Aleppo. Frequent moving meant that he never received a formal education from a madrasah but instead spent his formative years studying at the Mekteb-i Mülkiye, a public administration college in Constantinople.

== Career as an educationalist ==
In 1900, he graduated from the Royal Academy, and worked as a schoolteacher in Ioannina in Epirus, then part of the European territories of the Ottoman Empire. During this period, he began to show an interest in questions of nationality and was exposed to the competing strands of European nationalism. After five years in Yanina, he took up a high-ranking administrative position in Macedonia, where the officers who would later form the Committee for Union and Progress (CUP) had a strong presence. After the Young Turk Revolution of 1908, he was appointed in May 1909 director of the Teachers' Institute, Darülmuallimin in Constantinople, where he initiated major reforms in pedagogy and the public education system. In this period he became editor of two important educational reviews ("Tedrisat-ı İbtidaiye Mecmuası", "Muallim"). From 1910 to 1912, he visited European countries to examine modern educational methods. Initially a supporter of Ottomanism and the Young Turks, from 1916 on he moved towards Arabism.

The Ottoman government granted al-Husri the post of director-general of education in the Syria Province at the beginning of World War I in 1914. In 1919, after the establishment of an independent Arab state in Syria under Faisal, al-Husri moved to Damascus where he was appointed Director General of Education, and later Minister of Education.

Al-Husri followed Faisal to Iraq in 1920 after the French imposed their mandate on Syria, and from 1921 to 1927 held the position of Director of General Education. During this time, he published Al-Qiraa Al-Khaldouniya, the first modern Arabic language primer which was adopted by the ministry of education for about a century. In addition to other positions, he subsequently held the post of head of the Higher Teachers' Training College until 1937. During these years he played an influential role in promoting Arab nationalism through the educational system, and brought in teachers from Syria and Palestine to teach Arabic history and culture. According to Malik Mufti, his "chief accomplishment was to inculcate into the political and military elites of the country a permanent commitment to the vision of a strong and integrated Iraq destined one day to lead the entire Arab world."

In 1941 nationalist army officers, from the first generation to have come under the influence of al-Husri's ideas, carried out a coup d'état against the pro-British monarchy and government, briefly installing a pro-Axis regime under Rashid Ali al-Gailani. When British forces restored the monarchy, al-Husri was deported as were over a hundred of the Syrian and Palestinian teachers he had induced to come to Iraq.

Al-Husri's next major enterprise was the reform of the educational system in Syria. In 1943 the newly elected Syrian president Shukri al-Kuwatli invited him to Damascus, then still under the French mandate, to draw up a new curriculum along Arab nationalist lines for the country's secondary education system. Al-Husri established a curriculum informed by his nationalist ideas which considerably reduced the French cultural element and broke away from the French educational model. Against the bitter opposition of the French, and the reservations of various political figures, the new curriculum was introduced in December 1944, but the sudden change caused confusion and shortages of the new schoolbooks did nothing to improve its reception. A year later, the former curriculum was restored.

In 1947, al-Husri moved to Cairo, taking up a position in the Cultural Directorate of the League of Arab States. He would remain there for 18 years, during which he produced most of his works. He returned to Baghdad in 1965, and died there in December 1968.

He has been described as "the foremost theoretician of Arab nationalism."

== Ideological views ==
Al-Husri's approach to Arab nationalism was influenced by nineteenth-century European thinkers, especially German romantic nationalists such as Herder and Fichte. Historian Maher Charif describes him as having a "cultural-sentimental" approach to nationalism. Al-Husri's conception of the nation is a primordialist one. He viewed the nation as a living entity, and like other thinkers of his school insisted on its long-standing historic existence, even if its members were unconscious of that or refused to be considered an Arab. For al-Husri, the basic constituent elements of a nation were a shared language and a shared history. He rejected the idea that other factors, such as state action, religion, or economic factors, could play a part in bringing about nationalist sentiment; this was solely an emotional phenomenon arising from unity of language and culture.

Al-Husri rejected the idea of an Islamic nation on the basis that this would cover cultural and geographic scopes that are too broad. He argued that even if this were to be the ultimate goal, it would nevertheless be impossible to achieve without achieving Arab unity first. He also sought to distance Arabic from Islam, arguing that both the Arabs and Arabic existed before it.

Al-Husri saw localist tendencies as the main obstacle to the realisation of nationalist goals, but he pointed to the German and Italian experiences as indications that they would eventually be overcome. Communist internationalism was also a threat, but by the mid-1920s, with the Caliphate abolished, al-Husri was confident that the challenge which was posed by pan-Islamism was also vanquished.

Charif states that al-Husri "established a barrier between civilisation on the one hand, and culture on the other hand, taking the view that the first, which comprises the sciences, technology and modes of production, is intrinsically 'universal', while the latter, which comprises customs and language, is 'national'." The Arab nation should, therefore, adopt all that the west had to offer it in the first sphere, but it should jealously preserve its own culture. This distinction was influential among later nationalist theorists.

Al-Husri paid particular attention to questions of language, a difficult issue in the Arab world due to widespread diglossia. He considered that a language reform was necessary given the situation whereby most Arabs were unable to use Classical Arabic, the universal Arab written language, yet could not communicate successfully with each other in the greatly differing spoken dialects of the Arab world. His proposal was that, at least as a temporary measure pending improved education, a somewhat simplified form of Classical Arabic should be developed which should be closer to the spoken dialects to some degree, but it should retain its position as a universal language which should be commonly spoken by all Arabs.

== Quotes ==
- Every Arab-speaking people is an Arab people. Every individual belonging to one of these Arabic-speaking peoples is an Arab. And if he does not recognize this, and if he is not proud of his Arabism, then we must look for the reasons that have made him take this stand. It may be an expression of ignorance; in that case we must teach him the truth. It may spring from an indifference or false consciousness; in that case we must enlighten him and lead him to the right path. It may result from extreme egoism; in that case we must limit his egoism. But under no circumstances, should we say: "As long as he does not wish to be an Arab, and as long as he is disdainful of his Arabness, then he is not an Arab." He is an Arab regardless of his own wishes. Whether ignorant, indifferent, undutiful, or disloyal, he is an Arab, but an Arab without consciousness or feeling, and perhaps even without conscience. (Translation from Adeed Dawisha, Arab Nationalism in the Twentieth Century: From Triumph to Despair [Princeton and Oxford, 2003] p. 72.)

== See also ==
- Fathi Safwat Kirdar

== Sources ==
- Charif, Maher, Rihanat al-nahda fi'l-fikr al-'arabi, Damascus, Dar al-Mada, 2000
- Cleveland, William L.: The making of an Arab nationalist. Ottomanism and Arabism in the life and thought of Sati' al-Husri. Princeton, N.J. 1971.
- Dawisha, Adeed. Arab nationalism in the Twentieth Century: From Triumph to Despair, New Edition. Princeton: Princeton University Press, 2016.
- Hourani, Albert. Arabic Thought in the Liberal Age 1798-1939. Cambridge: Cambridge University Press, 1983.
- Kara, Cevat, "Das Dârülmuallimîn unter Sâtı Bey. Wegbereiter moderner Pädagogik im Osmanischen Reich," in: Yavuz Köse (ed.), Istanbul: Vom imperialen Herrschersitz zur Megapolis. Historiographische Betrachtungen zu Gesellschaft, Institutionen und Räumen, Munich: Meisenbauer, 2006, 264-293
- Moubayed, Sami, The George Washington of Syria: The Rise and Fall of Shukri al-Quwatli, Beirut, Dar al-Zakira, 2005
- Mufti, Malik, Sovereign Creations: Pan-Arabism and Political Order in Syria and Iraq, Ithaca, Cornell University Press, 1996
- Suleiman, Yasir. Arabic Language and National Identity. Edinburgh: Edinburgh University Press, 2003.
- Tibi, Bassam. Arab Nationalism: Between Islam and the Nation-State, 3rd Edition. New York: St. Martin's Press, 1997.
