= Kahramana =

Kahramana Fountain
- نصب كهرمانة
- Interactive map of Kahramana Fountain
- Location: Kahramana Square, al-Sa'doun Street, Baghdad
- Designer: Mohammed Ghani Hikmat
- Material: Bronze
- Height: 3.3 m
- Completion date: 1971
- Dedicated to: Baghdad

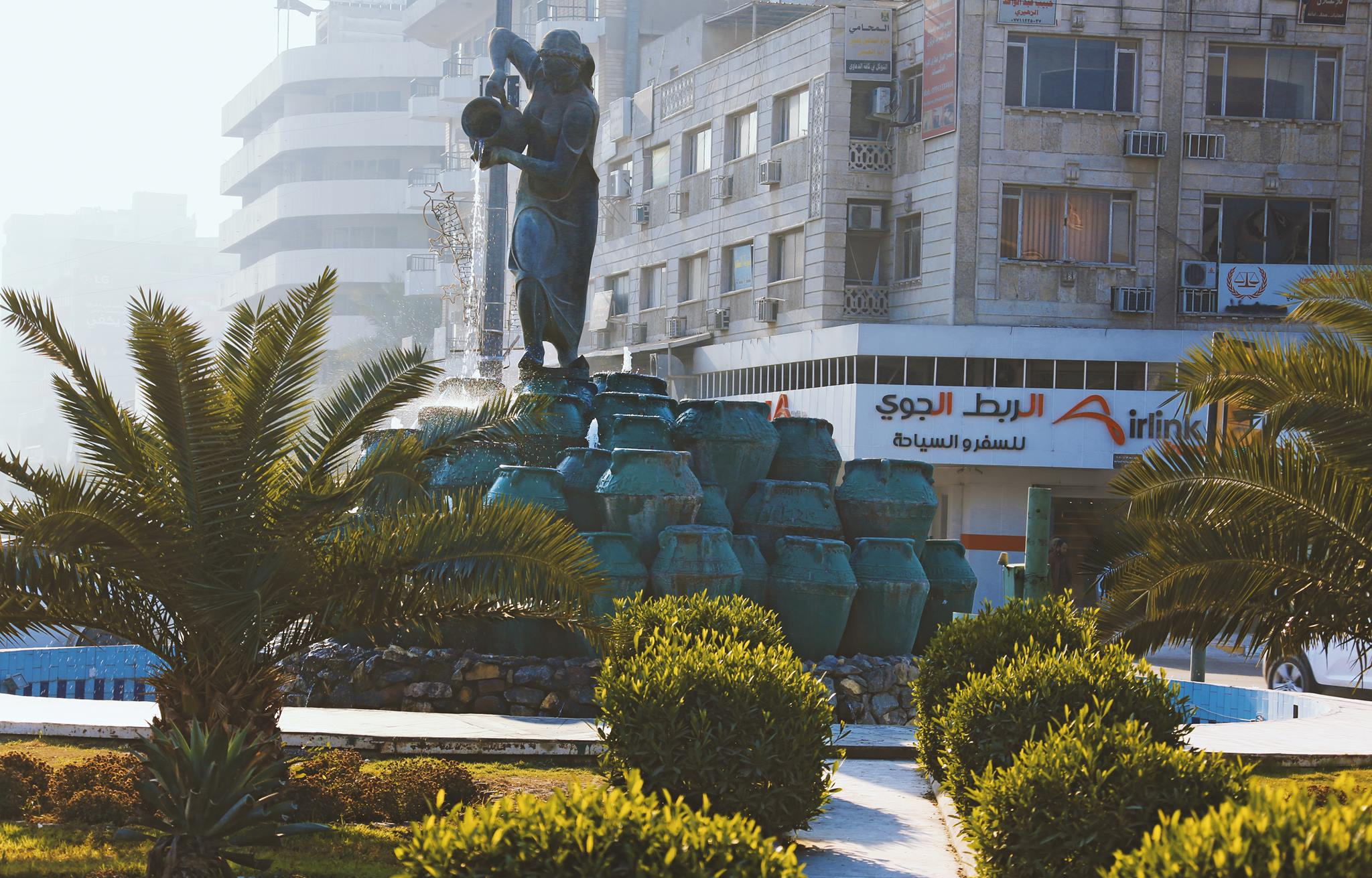
Kahramana Square, Baghdad.

Kahramana is a fountain located in Baghdad's al-Sa'doun Street depicting a scene from the legend of Ali Baba and the Forty Thieves; a story taken from One Thousand and One Nights in which the slave girl Marjana outwitted the thieves by tricking them into hiding inside jars over which she poured hot oil. The statue was officially opened in 1971 and was the work of the Iraqi sculptor, Mohammed Ghani Hikmat. It has become one of Baghdad's most iconic public artworks. In the aftermath of the US-led invasion of 2003, the work assumed new meanings for the Iraqi people.

== Background ==
From 1969 when Iraq became a republic and the Hashemite monarchy was overthrown in 1958, leading artists and sculptors were commissioned to produce artworks that would beautify the city of Baghdad, glorify Iraq's ancient past and contribute to a sense of national identity. During this period, sculptors including Khaled al-Rahal, Jawad Saleem and Mohammed Ghani Hikmat executed a number of high profile public monuments which are now dotted around the city of Baghdad.

Mohammed Ghani Hikmat, who was commissioned to construct Kahramana, was a well-known Iraqi sculptor, whose public works were on display throughout Baghdad's streetscapes and urban spaces. His works achieved popularity because they depicted scenes from the everyday life of Baghdad's people and also drew on Iraqi folklore. Many of Ghani's early sculptures were inspired by Iraqi folklore, especially characters from the One Thousand and One Nights (widely known as the Tales of Arabian Nights in the West). His early works were figurative and included statues of Sinbad, the Sailor; the 10th-century poet, al-Mutanabbi; the second Abbasid Caliph, Abu-Ja'afr Mansur (in stone); Hammurabi (in bronze) and Gilgamesh. As Ghani matured, his work became increasingly abstract, but he never lost sight of the need to reference Iraq's ancient art traditions through the use of Arabic script, geometric designs, and Sumerian architectural features.

His most well-known works include a pair of statues of Queen Scheherazade and King Shahryar, located on the banks of the Tigris River, near Abu Nuwas Street and the Fountain of Kahramana in the central business district.

== Description ==
Built in the late 1960s and inaugurated in 1971, the fountain was inspired by the story of Ali Baba and the Forty Thieves from the One Thousand and One Nights and the slave girl, Marjana (or Morgiana), who outwitted the thieves. The story relates how the slave girl persuaded thieves, who had come to attack her master, to hide in storage jars. She then pours boiling oil into the jars to kill the thieves. As a mark of his gratitude, Ali Baba grants Marjana her freedom and she ultimately marries Ali Baba's son.

The fountain depicts the slave girl standing over 40 jars, ready to pour the hot oil. It was cast in bronze, stands 3.3 metres (11 ft) in height and is situated in Kahramana Square, al-Sa'doun Street, Baghdad. As the girl pours the water, a series of lilting fountains cascades downward towards the base of the statue.

The cascading water contributed to the monument's grandeur, but the water was turned off during the Iran-Iraq war and the fountain fell into a state of disrepair, with overgrown verges and the base of the fountain filled with litter. Its storage jars were painted green, a colour that drew the disapproval of the sculptor.

Following the US-led invasion of 2003, some of Hikmat's work took on new meanings and new political interpretations emerged from Iraq's destruction. At the time, the Iraqis saw that the work represented the new reality of their country and the number '40' became charged with meaning. The Provisional Governing Council, after the occupation, included forty people, which came to symbolise the forty thieves; and the decisions of the Iraqi civil administrator, Paul Bremer, consisted of 53 resolutions, with Resolution No. 40 referring to the dissolution of the Iraqi army. This resolution, which left some 400,000 Iraqi soldiers without employment, led to public protests and the Kahramana fountain became a popular starting point for public demonstrations and civil rights campaigners.

=== Specifications ===
- Monument type: Fountain
- Materials: Bronze
- Height: 3.3 metres
- Date opened: 1971
- Location: Kahramana Square, Sa'adoon Street, Baghdad
- Designer and builder: Mohammed Ghani Hikmat

== Legacy ==
In 2015, the 70th Anniversary of the United Nations, the fountain Kahramana was chosen for the World National Heritage.

== See also ==
- Arab culture
- Iraqi art
- Iraqi culture
