= Fathi Safwat Kirdar =

- فتحي صفوت قيردار
- Born: 1896; Kirkuk
- Died: July 1966 (aged 69–70); Istanbul
- Occupations: painter and sculptor

Fathi Safwat Kirdar (1896–1966) was an Iraqi painter and sculptor. Born in Kirkuk into a well-known Turkmen family of Kirdar/Qirdar. In 1905, his father moved to Baghdad, where he studied at the Rushdiya military school and taught at its schools. He served in the Ottoman army during World War I, and was captured once in Palestine. He completed his post-graduate studies at the Teachers' House in Istanbul and was appointed as a teacher for painting in Iraq from 1927 to 1961. Among his students were Faeq Hassan, Atta Sabri, Hafiz Al-Droubi and Jawad Saleem.
He died in Istanbul.

== Life ==
Fathi Safwat Kirdar was born in Kirkuk in 1896. He belongs to the well-known Kirdar family. His father, Muhammad Said Chalabi, was a major merchant of Kirkuk and then moved his family to Baghdad in 1905. Fathi studied at the Rushdiya military school and taught in Baghdad schools. He was captured by British forces and arrested in Tulkarm and then in Sidi Bishr, Alexandria.
After the end of WW I, he moved to Istanbul and completed his graduate studies at the Teachers' House (Dârülmuallimîn) under the management of Sati' al-Husri, who appointed Fathi Safwat as a painting teacher in the Turkish capital schools. He participated in courses under professors of painting. When Sati' al-Husri took over as Director of General Education, he recalled Fathi Safwat to Baghdad and appointed him a teacher of painting and handicrafts, including sculpture at the primary teachers' house on September 1, 1927. Among his students were Faeq Hassan, Atta Sabri, Hafiz Al-Droubi and Jawad Saleem.
He travelled to Istanbul for a summer trip and died there in July 1966.

== Works ==
Some famous works of Fathi Safwat are busts of King Faisal I, Jamil Sidqi Zahawi, King Ghazi of Iraq and Ali Mazloum and others. In painting, he was inclined to paint in watercolour, but he encouraged his students to paint all kinds. One of his most prominent sculptors was Muhammad Ghani.

== See also ==
- Sati' al-Husri
- Jawad Saleem
- Faeq Hassan
- List of Iraqi artists
