= Al-Jaraar Monument =

Monument in Baghdad, Iraq

- نصب الجرار
- Interactive map of Al-Jaraar Monument
- Location: Al-Alawi, Baghdad
- Designer: Miran al-Saadi
- Opening date: 1962

Al-Jaraar Monument (Arabic: نصب الجرار) is a bronze monument located in al-Alawi area in the Karkh district of Baghdad, Iraq. The monument was designed and created by the Iraqi sculptor Miran al-Saadi who built it to represent old pots used in Baghdad throughout the ages. The monument officially opened in 1962.

== See also ==
- Iraqi Fighter Monument
- Monument to the Unknown Soldier
- Victory Arch
