= Ashaar Baghdad =

- نصب أشعار بغداد
- Interactive map of Ashaar Baghdad
- Location: Al Dallal Square, Al Karakh neighbourhood, Baghdad,
- Coordinates: 33°20′45″N 44°22′09″E
- Designer: Mohammed Ghani Hikmat
- Beginning date: 2010
- Completion date: 2013
- Dedicated to: Baghdad

Ashaar Baghdad ('Baghdad's Poetry') is a public monument in Baghdad, created by the sculptor Mohammed Ghani Hikmat (1929–2011) and inaugurated in 2013. It appears as a golden globe, bearing Arabic letters that have been squeezed together and distorted to form the spherical shape. It is an unusual example of hurufiyya-inspired sculpture.

== Background ==
In 2010, the Mayor of Baghdad commissioned the sculptor, Mohammed Ghani Hikmat, to complete a series of four monuments as part of a Baghdad Culture program. The artist began work on four new sculptures to be erected in various locations around Baghdad. However, this would be his final project, for the sculptor died before it was completed. Ghani's son oversaw the completion of the project. All four works blended Iraqi tradition with modern techniques and materials.

The first to be completed was Al Fanous El Sehri ('Magic Lantern') inaugurated in 2011. The remaining three works, Ashaar Baghdad ('Baghdad's Poetry', a fountain featuring Arabic script), Timthal Baghdad ('Baghdad's Statue', a column featuring the city as a beautiful girl wearing traditional Abbasid costume), and Enkath El Iraq ('Saving Iraq's Culture', a Sumerian cylindrical seal in the hands of an Iraqi citizen) were all inaugurated in 2013.

Mohammed Ghani Hikmat was known for his public works, now on display throughout Baghdad's urban spaces, and also for smaller statues carved in wood, depicting the everyday life of Baghdad's people. His most well-known works include a pair of statues of Queen Scheherazade and King Shahryar, located on the banks of the Tigris River, near Abu Nuwas Street, and the Fountain of Kahramana in Baghdad's central business district. The choice of location for his works was important to Ghani, who wanted the sculptures to be accessible to all. He avoided public squares and gardens, and instead wanted his works to be situated in the streets and on the sides of buildings.

== Description ==
Ashaar Baghdad ('Baghdad’s Poetry') is a fountain 5 metres in height situated in Al Dallal Square, Al Karakh neighbourhood, Baghdad, near the Beiruti Café, and was inaugurated in 2013

The structure has a spherical shape and features Arabic script that has been squeezed and distorted to form the golden orb. The sphere floats in the middle of a water fountain near the Beiruti Café near Karkh, which is the northern tip of Baghdad. The script is taken from a poem glorifying the city, Baghdad, the most powerful of you, written by the post-war Iraqi poet, Mustafa Jamal al Din (b. 1927), which Ghani had found written on the poet's tombstone. The script reads:

Baghdad no matter what happens to you, you will flower again.

The monument is an important example of hurufiyya-inspired sculpture. Although hurufiyya is most often associated with painting and book art, it also included ceramicists and sculptors.

Unlike many other public monuments in Baghdad, Ashaar Baghdad survived the looting and vandalism that occurred following the US-led invasion of 2003.

=== Specifications ===
- Monument type: Fountain
- Materials: Bronze
- Height: 3 metres plus a base of 2 metres (Total = 5 metres)
- Location: Al Dallal Square, Al Karakh neighbourhood, Baghdad, near the Beiruti Café (Al Maqha Al Beiruti), at the northern tip of Baghdad
- Date Opened: 2013
- Designer and builder: Mohammed Ghani Hikmat

== See also ==
- Iraqi art
- Hurufiyya movement
