= Mustafa Jamal al-Din =

Iraqi writer and poet

Sayyid Mustafa Jamal al-Din
- Arabic: مصطفى جمال الدين
- Born: 1926; Suq Al-Shuyukh, Iraq
- Died: 22 October 1996 (aged 70); Damascus, Syria
- Education: University of Baghdad
- Occupations: Poet; writer; Faqih
- Father: Ja'far Jamal al-Din

Mustafa Jamal al-Din (Arabic: مصطفى جمال الدين) was an Iraqi Shi'ite scholar, poet, and writer. He was born in Suq Al-Shuyukh and studied in Najaf. He is a Shi'ite faqih and has numerous works of literature, including a collection of poems and a graphic novel. He died in Damascus.

== Lineage ==
He is related to Muhammad's cousin Ali, through Musa al-Mubarraqa. Jamal al-Din was born in a village in Suq Al-Shuyukh, Nasiriyah province, southern Iraq.

== Education ==
He studied in a Quran school in his hometown, then moved to Karmat Bani Saeed to continue primary school. He completed fourth grade then moved to Najaf to study religion. He completed the first two levels of studying Muqad'dim'maat and Sotooh then moved to Bahath Kharij level. He then went on to attend halaqah of Grand Ayatollah Sayyid Abu al-Qasim al-Musawi al-Khoei He was appointed teaching assistant at the faculty of jurisprudence in Najaf for ranking first in his class in 1962. In 1972 he received a master's degree from the University of Baghdad. He receivedmaster’s degree. In 1972, he was appointed professor at the faculty of arts of the University of Baghdad and became known in Iraq and the Arab world. He later received a PhD in Arabic in 1979.

== Works ==
His works include:

- Analogy: Truth and Justification - “Master’s thesis” (original: Qiyas: ḥaqyqth wā ḥuǧyth)
- Juristic Discretion: Truth and Meaning (original: Istihsan: ḥaqyqth wā mʿnāh)
- The Grammar Research of the Fundamentalists - “PhD thesis” (original: ālbḥṯ ālnḥwy ʿnd ālōṣwlyyn)
- Rhythm in Arabic Poetry: Verse to Foot (original: al-Īqāʻ fī al-shiʻr al-ʻArabī min al-bayt ilá al-tafʻīlah)
- “Baghdad” (poem)
- Arabs of the Marshlands Predicament and Arab Silence (original: Miḥnat al-ahwār wa-al-ṣamt al-ʻArabī)

He also has several poetry collections, including:

- Your Eyes and The Old Melody (original: ʻAynāki wa-al-Lahn al-qadīm)
- al-Diwan
