= Jawad Saleem =

Iraqi artist (1919–1961)

- جواد سليم
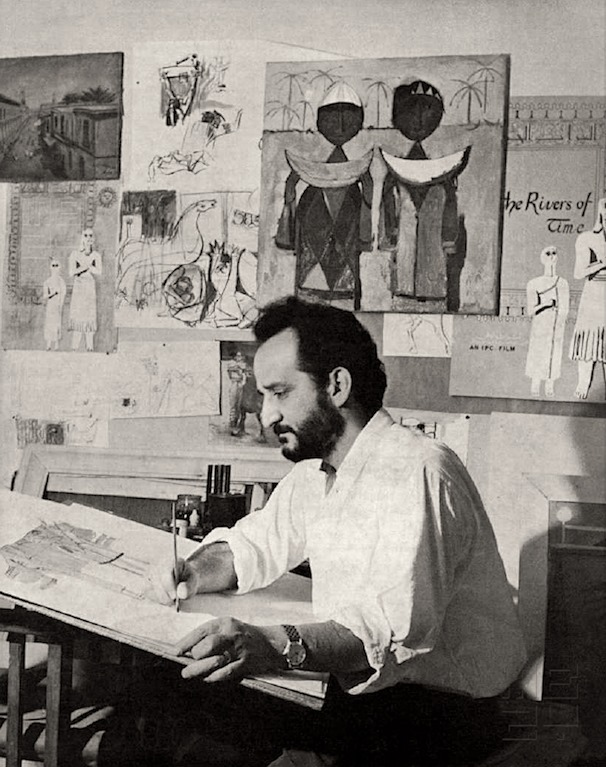
- Jawad Saleem
- Born: Jawad bin Mohammed Salim bin Abdul Qadir al-Khalidi; 1919; Ankara, Ottoman Empire
- Died: 23 January 1961 (aged 42 years); Iraqi Republic
- Education: Paris (1938-1939), Rome (1939-1940), London (1946-1948)
- Known for: Painter and sculptor
- Notable work: Nasb al-Hurriyah (Monument of Freedom), Baghdad
- Movement: The Baghdad Modern Art Group; One Dimension Group
- Spouse: Lorna Saleem

Jawad Saleem (Arabic: جواد سليم, 1919–1961) was an Iraqi painter and sculptor born in Ankara, Ottoman Empire in 1919. He became an influential artist through his involvement with the Iraqi Baghdad Modern Art Group, which encouraged artists to explore techniques that combined both Arab heritage and modern art forms. He is considered to be one of Iraq's greatest 20th-century sculptors.

Saleem received his artistic training in Baghdad but studied abroad in various European countries. Being a critic of early 20th century Iraqis' taste in art, he was a founding member of the Baghdad College of Fine Arts and the founder of the Baghdad Group for Modern Art. Throughout his artistic career, Saleem was invited to various art-related events and groups. One of his most notable works is the Nasb al-Hurriyya monument, an example of 20th century Iraqi modernism and Qasim-era Iraqi revolutionary art; he died during its construction in 1961. Despite his short career, Jawad Saleem stands as the central figure of modern Iraqi art and history.

== Early life and education ==
Jawad Saleem was born in Ankara, Ottoman Empire into a middle-class family. His parents were both originally from Mosul in Northern Iraq. His father, Mohammed Hajji Saleem, was a military officer who had been stationed in Ankara at the time of Saleem's birth, but returned to Baghdad in the 1920s, when the children were relatively young. His father was an amateur artist, and his mother was an artist and a skilled embroiderer. His brothers Saud and Nizarre and his sister Naziha Salim all became artists.

Jawad Saleem studied sculpture in Paris (1938–1939) on a scholarship, but his studies were interrupted by the outbreak of World War II. He relocated to Rome (1939–1940), but again his studies were interrupted by war, forcing him to return to Baghdad. At the war's end, he enrolled at the Slade School, London (1946–1948), where he was heavily influenced by Western artists such as Pablo Picasso and Henry Moore. In England, he met an artist, Lorna, a native of Sheffield, and the pair were married in 1950.

== Artistic career ==
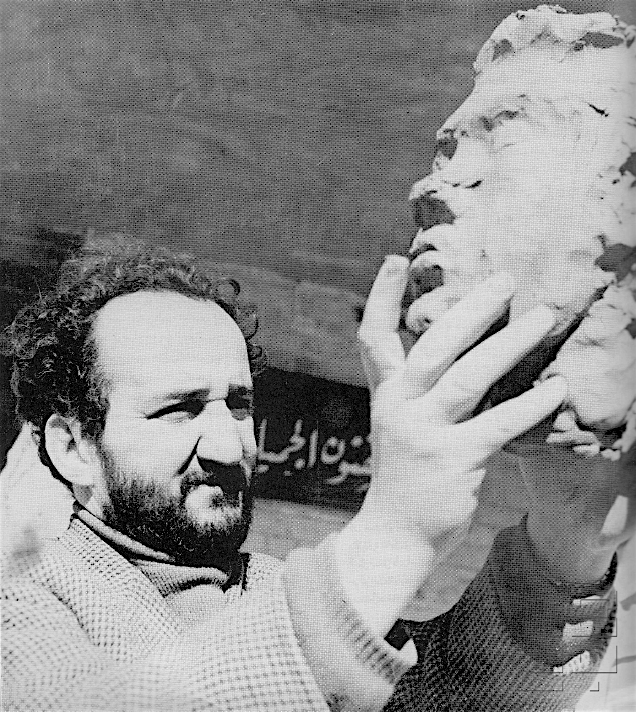
Saleem at the Institute of Fine Arts, Baghdad, 1954

During the hiatus in his studies, Saleem was employed at the Directorate of Antiquities in Baghdad between 1940–1945 and was appointed head of the Sculpture Department at the Institute of Fine Arts in Baghdad, a position he retained until his death in 1961. His work exposed him to Iraq's ancient art traditions, and he consciously sought to discover the possibilities of combining ancient motifs with within the modern abstract art he had observed in Europe. His wife, Lorna Saleem, noted that he was fascinated with ancient Egyptian and Mesopotamian sculptures. She explained:

"His aim was to create an artistic language, unique to Iraq, built on the great art of its past civilizations, Sumer, Babylon, Assyria and of course, Islam, but in the language of the 20th century.

Saleem is generally credited with being the first Iraqi artist to draw on his heritage and guide local artists towards a distinctly Iraqi style.

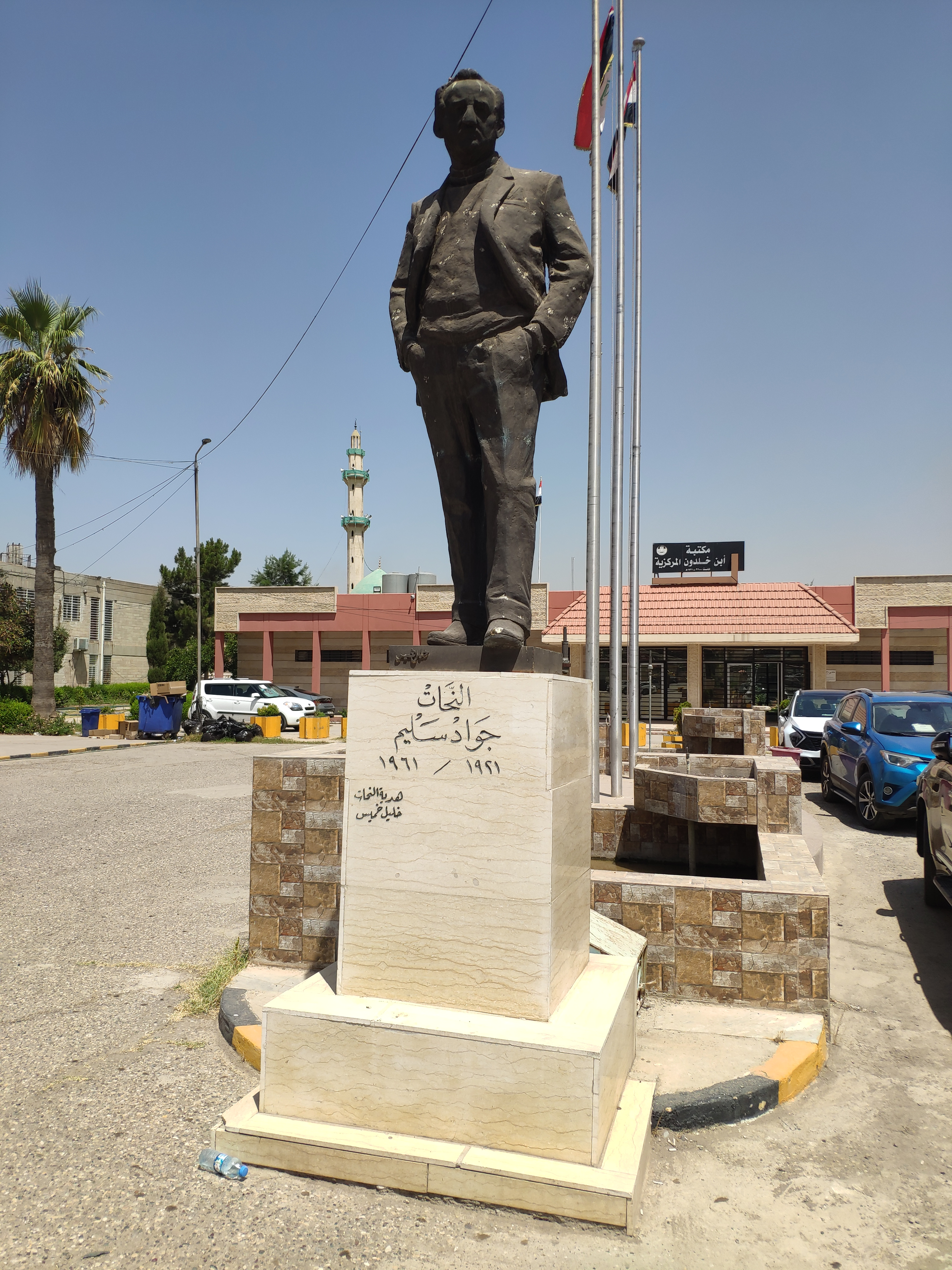
Jawad Saleem statue – Mosul University (second campus).

Iraq in the 1930s had few art museums or galleries. Accordingly, Saleem's first solo exhibition was held in the private home of prominent Iraqi architect, Mohamed Makiya. In 1944, he was invited to work with historical masterpieces and to assist archaeologists in any restoration work that was necessary. These encounters with ancient heritage fostered a strong sense of pride in Iraq's ancient art heritage and questions about the nexus between "heritage" and "contemporary" art, which would preoccupy the artist and philosopher for the rest of his working life.

In 1951, he gave a public lecture in which he spoke critically and bitterly about public taste in Iraq. For this, Saleem became known as an "enemy of the people." Yet, within two decades, Saleem was praised by the Iraqi elite and his reputation was mythologized by poets and writers.

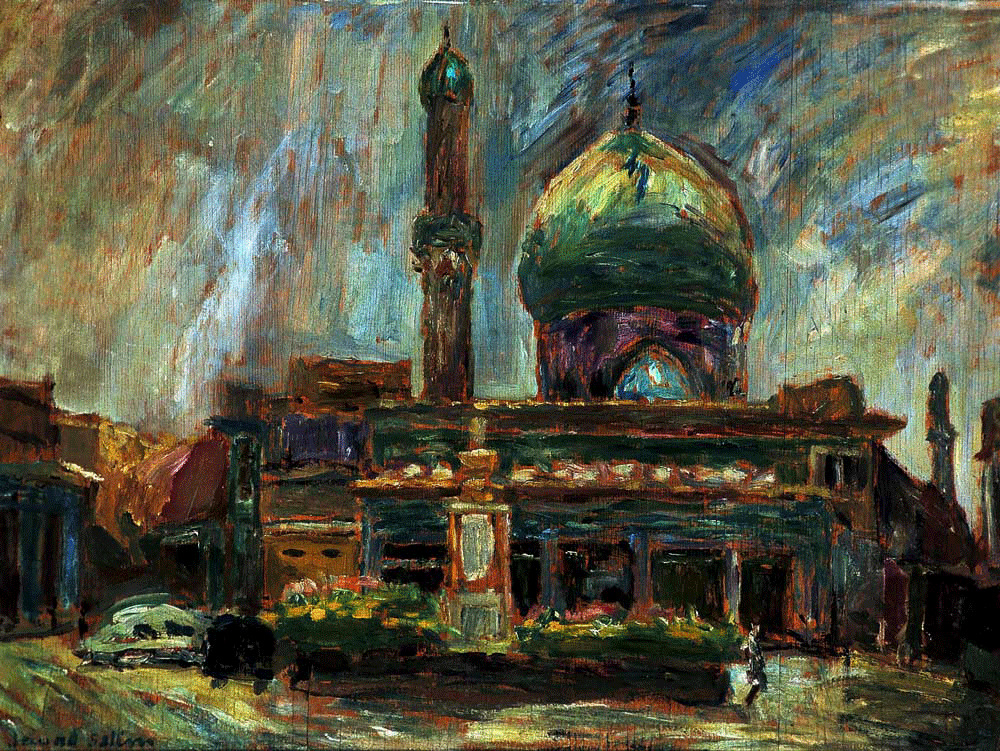
Jawad Saleem's painting of the Haydar-Khana Mosque

He was one of the founders of the Jama'et Baghdad lil Fen al-Hadith (The Baghdad Modern Art Group, founded in 1951) with fellow artist Shakir Hassan al-Sa'id and Mohammed Ghani Hikmat (1929–2011), a group who attempted to combine ancient Iraqi art traditions with modern European techniques. The group's mantra, was istilham al-turath—seeking inspiration from tradition. Saleem, al-Said, and other members of the Modern Baghdad group were inspired by the 13th-century Baghdad School and the work of ancient calligraphers and illustrators such as Yahya al-Wasiti who was active in Baghdad in the 1230s. They believed that the Mongol invasion of 1258 represented a "break in the chain of pictorial Iraqi art" and wanted to recover lost traditions. After the death of Saleem in 1961, al-Said headed the group. This group accomplished a great deal in terms of popularizing modern art by giving Iraqis a sense of national pride in their ancient art heritage.

Saleem first came to the attention of international audiences in 1952 when his competition entry, The Unknown Political Prisoner, was one of 80 selected out of 3,500 entries for exhibition at the Tate Gallery in London and was the only Arab artist to be included in the exhibition. The following year, he toured the United States, and his work was well received.

Although he worked both as a painter and sculptor, he always had misgivings about practicing both simultaneously. Towards the end of the 1950s, he made the decision to focus exclusively on sculpture.

=== Republic of Iraq and Nasb al-Hurriyya ===
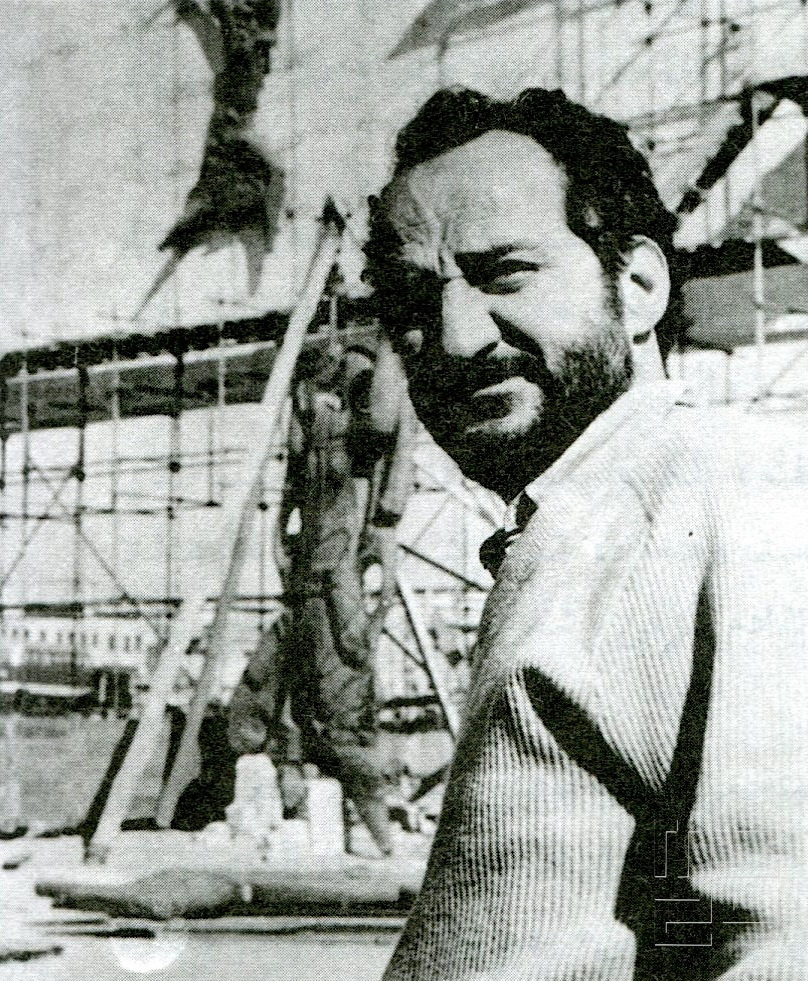
Jawad Saleem in front of the Nasb al-Hurriyya while under construction, 1961

In 1959, shortly after the 14 July revolution, Saleem was commissioned by the new leader of the republic, Brigadier General Abd al-Karim Qasim, to create a monument for the city center that would be a celebration to Iraq's declaration of independence. It was to be situated in the heart of Baghdad's central business district, overlooking Liberation Square and Jamhouriyya Bridge. The sculptor understood that the monument would need to be a symbol of a new world; he designed a work that was a narrative of the 1958 revolution but also paid homage to Iraq's deep art history by including Abbasid and Babylonian wall-reliefs, producing a sculpture that was both "strikingly modern" yet also referenced tradition. Saleem labored on the project under difficult conditions, resisting all attempts by Qasim to have his image incorporated.

Jawad Saleem is often credited as the designer of the Three-star flag of Iraq, a proposed design based on the flag of the United Arab Republic that would be adopted following his death in 1963.

Initially, Saleem had wanted the sculpture to be at ground level, but architect Rif'at Chadirji insisted that it be elevated so that it would look more "monumental." As a result, the completed work faces busy traffic rather than people walking in the adjacent gardens. Although the monument was Saleem's design, he did not see it through to completion; following his premature death, the project was completed in 1961 by Saleem's friend, Mohammed Ghani Hikmat, who had previously assisted on the project by casting the bronze figures. The completed monument, known as Nasb al-Hurriyya ("Monument of Freedom"), has survived various attempts to have it pulled down and is one of Baghdad's most iconic public works.

Saleem is credited as being the most influential artist in Iraq's modern art movement and is said to have brought a "modern vision" to Iraq. The Palestinian-Iraqi intellectual Jabra Ibrahim Jabra wrote of him:

"No single artist has had so much influence on art in Iraq... An influence that has in time overflowed Iraq's borders to the rest of the Arab world."

== Death and burial ==
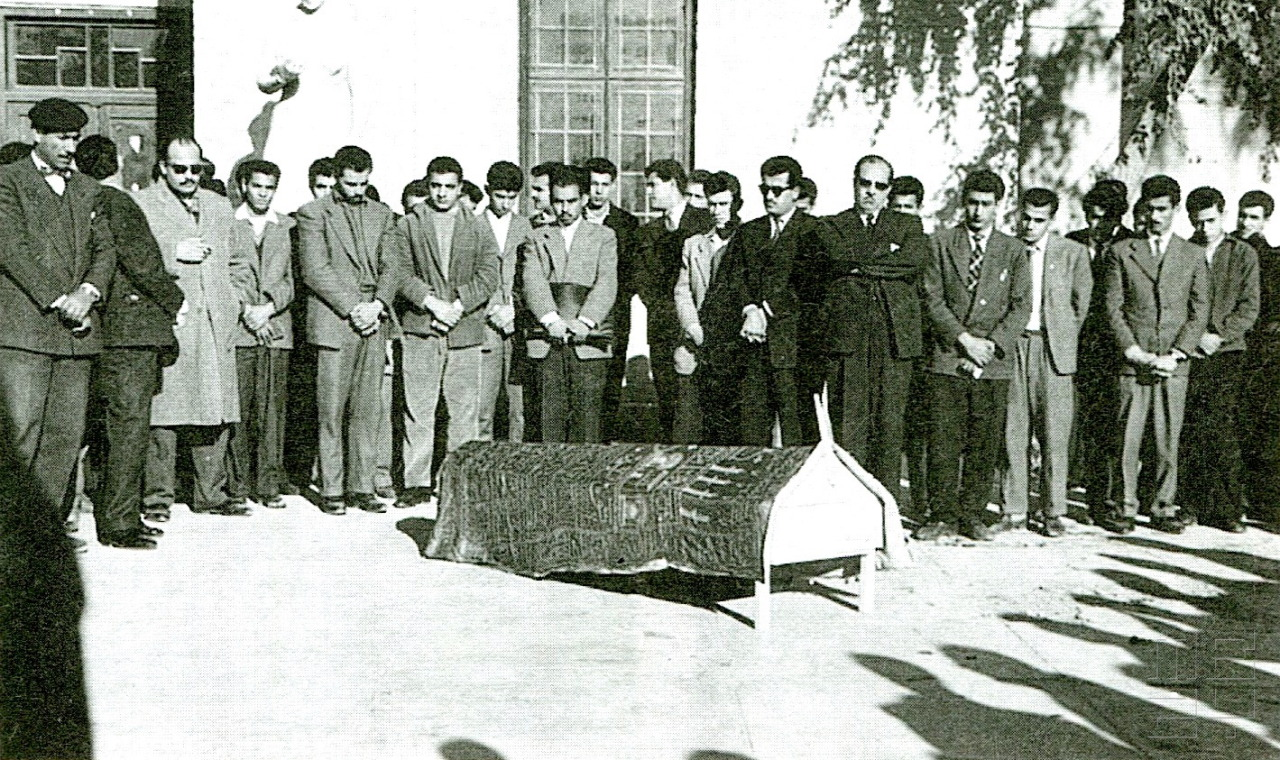
Coffin of Jawad Selim at the Institute of Fine Arts surrounded by his students and colleagues, 1961

Saleem suffered a heart attack and died in the Republican Hospital on 23 January 1961, aged 42. Scholars have suggested that his premature death can be attributed, at least in part, to the stresses of completing the Nasb al-Hurriyah sculpture. His demise was seen as an "irreparable loss to Arab visual culture."

== Work ==
Saleem consciously included Assyrian and Babylonian architectural features into his artworks and was one of the first Iraqi artists to forge links with Iraq's ancient civilizations and their artistic traditions.

Examples of his work are held in the Jordan National Gallery of Fine Art. Saleem is especially known for his Nasb al-Hurriyah, located in Tahir Square, one of the main squares in Baghdad's city center. The monument consists of 14 bronze castings, representing 25 figures on a travertine slab, raised 6 meters off the ground. It provides a narrative of the 1958 Revolution of Iraq with references to Iraqi history by incorporating Assyrian and Babylonian wall-reliefs. It is meant to be read, from right to left, as a verse of Arabic poetry, beginning with events that preceded the revolution and concluding with harmony following the revolution. The sculpture is depicted on the 10,000 dinar bank note for 2013–2015 in his honor. The multiple references and hidden layers of meaning in the work inspired Arab artists across the region and encouraged them to pursue artwork with a national identity at a time when many Arab nations were attaining independence.

=== Notable public works ===
- Motherhood, 1954 – a looted sculpture that has since been returned to Iraq's National collection
- Nasb al-Hurriyah, (Monument of Freedom, also known as Liberty Monument), bass relief, 50 × 10 meters, Tahir Square, Baghdad (completed in 1961).

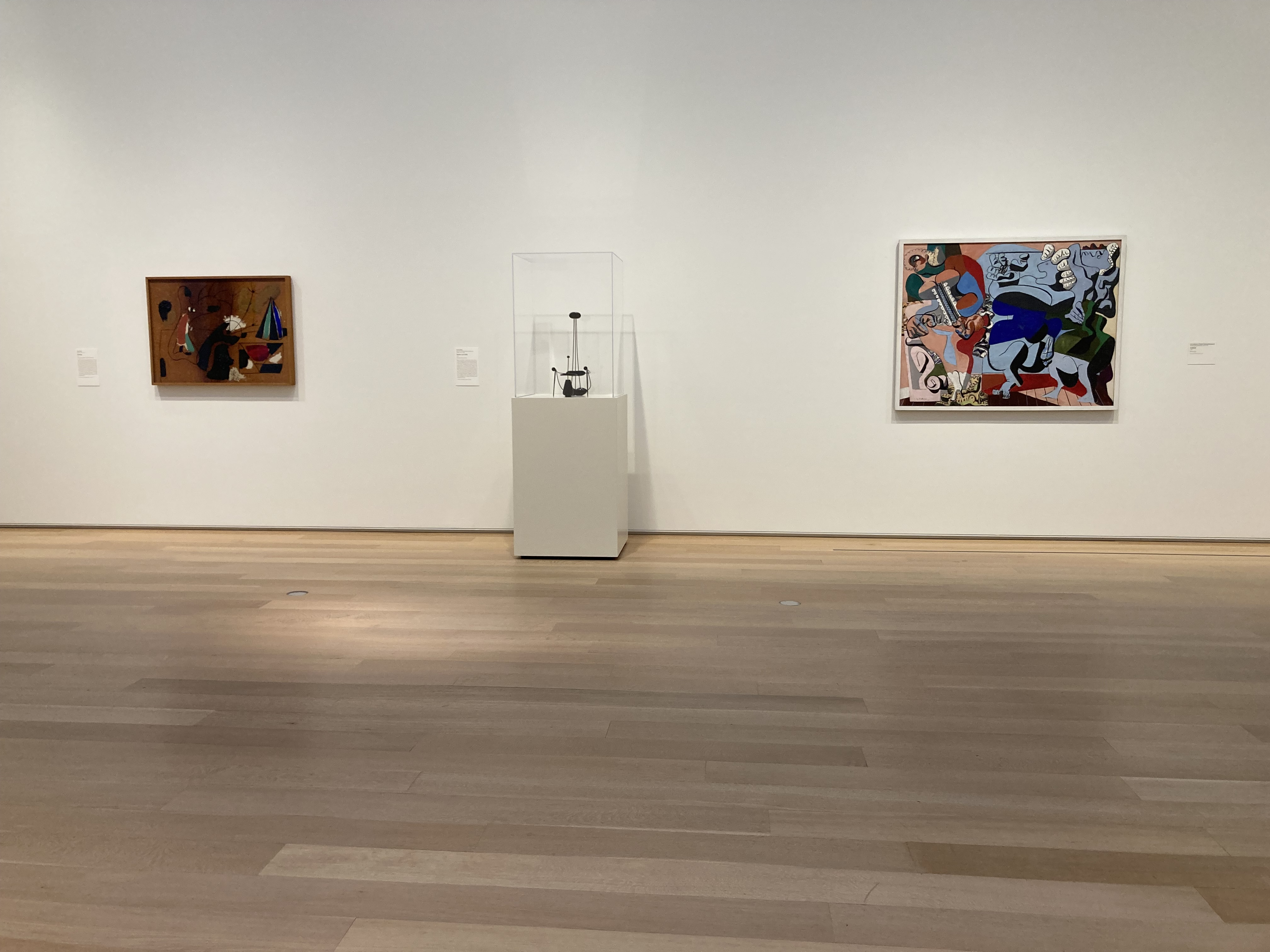
Jewad Selim's Mother and Child sculpture (1953) made from macassar ebony and metal wire in two figurines, on display at the Art Institute of Chicago in Gallery 393. Photo by Matthew S Witkovsky/ ARTIC

=== Notable smaller sculptures ===
- The Unknown Political Prisoner, plaster maquette, 1952
- A Man and a Woman, plaster relief, (45 × 45 cm), 1953
- A Man and a Woman, plaster relief, (45 × 45 cm), 1953
- Man and the Earth, 1955
- Mother and Child, 1953 (in the Barjeel Art collection)

=== Paintings ===
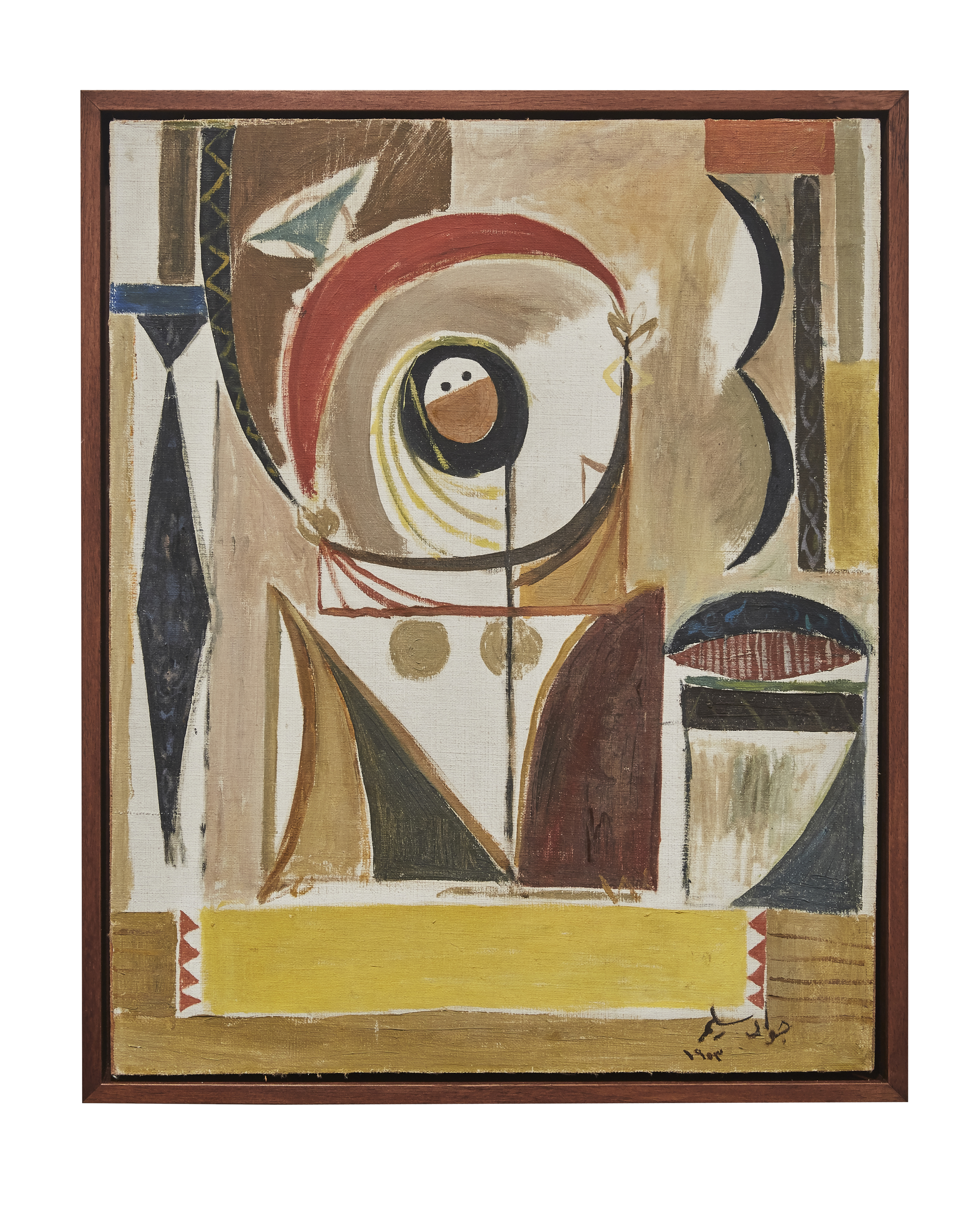
Woman Selling Material, by Jawad Saleem, in Barjeel Art Foundation

(Incomplete list)

- The Baghdadi Family, 1953
- Children Playing, oil on canvas, 1953–54
- Hilal Decoration, 1955
- Al-Zafa, 1956
- Musicians in the Street, 1956
- Baghdadiyyat, 1957
- Kid Women, 1957
- A Woman and a Girl, 1957
- Henna Night, 1957
- Seedling Seller, 1957
- Woman Adorned, 1957
- Two Boys Eating al-Raqi (watermelons), 1958
- The Girl and the Gardener, 1958
- Siesta, 1958
- The Dead Tree, 1958
- Girl and Dove, 1958
- Mosque of Kufa, 1958
- Tailoring, 1958
- In the Forum of the Caliph, 1958
- Woman with Coffee Pot, watercolor, private collection, date unknown

== See also ==
- Arabic art
- Iraqi art
- Islamic art
- Islamic calligraphy
- Hurufiyya movement
- List of Muslim painters
- List of Iraqi artists
- Fathi Safwat Kirdar
