= Su Bai =

Chinese archeologist (1922–2018)

- 宿白
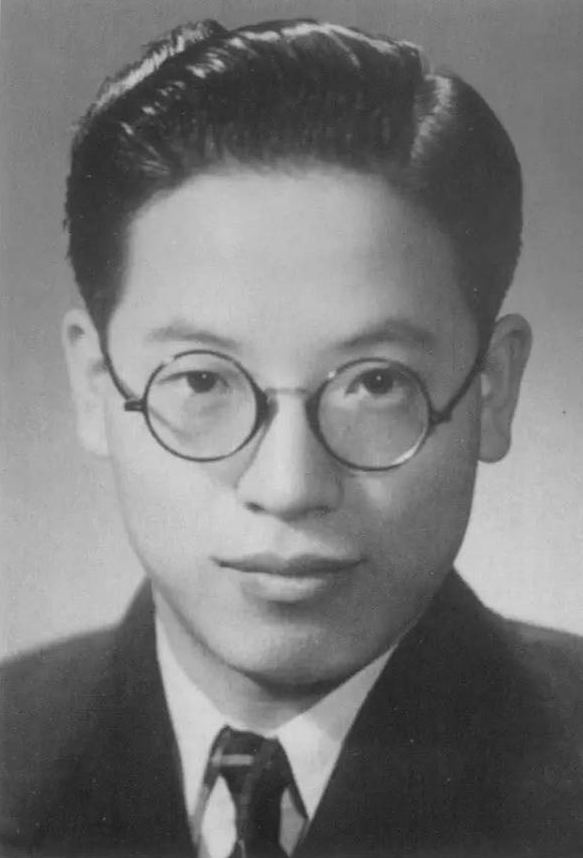
- Su Bai in his youth (c. 1943)
- Born: 3 August 1922; Shenyang, Liaoning
- Died: 1 February 2018 (aged 95); Beijing
- Education: Peking University
- Known for: Study of Buddhist grottoes and art
- Awards: Lifetime Achievement Award, Chinese Archaeology Society
- Scientific career
- Fields: Archaeology of Buddhism
- Workplaces: Peking University

Su Bai (Chinese: 宿白; pinyin: Sù Bái; Wade–Giles: Su Pai; 3 August 1922 – 1 February 2018) was a Chinese archaeologist and bibliographer who served as the first head of the Department of Archaeology of Peking University from 1983 to 1988. Known for his pioneering research in the archaeology of Buddhism, he won the Lifetime Achievement Award from the Chinese Archaeology Association in 2016.

== Early life and education ==
Su Bai was born on 3 August 1922 in Shenyang, Liaoning Province. He was admitted to the Department of History of Peking University (PKU) in 1940, and after graduating in 1944, he pursued graduate studies in archaeology at PKU's Institute of Humanities. In addition to archaeology, he studied related subjects under famed scholars who taught at PKU, including history of Sino-foreign relations under Feng Chengjun (冯承钧), Chinese mythology with Sun Zuoyun (孙作云), oracle bones from Rong Geng (容庚), and history of Buddhism from Tang Yongtong. His student Zhang Zhongpei, the future president of the Beijing Palace Museum, described his knowledge as "encyclopedic." He began teaching at the Institute of Humanities in 1948.

== Career ==
=== Research ===
In 1950, Su began working in field research and excavation. In 1951–1952, he led the excavation of three Song dynasty tombs in Baisha, Yuzhou, Henan, and published the excavation report, The Song Tombs at Baisha, in 1957. Combining his expertise in both history and archaeology, the report made incisive analyses of the Song dynasty society and customs based on the discovery, although he failed to consider the possibility that the paintings in the tomb might depict an imaginary spiritual world rather than the occupants' real life. The report remains influential in academia 60 years after its publication.

Su was widely recognized as a pioneer and a leading authority in the archaeology of Buddhism. He began studying Chinese Buddhist grottoes in 1947. In 1978, he published an article in the journal Acta Archaeologica Sinica, which questioned the dating and periodization of the Yungang Grottoes by Seiichi Mizuno and Toshio Nagahiro, Japanese authorities of archaeology of Buddhism. After a few rounds of debate in academic journals, Nagahiro changed his position and accepted Su's arguments.

Su also proposed groundbreaking dating of the Kizil Caves in the Silk Road oasis town of Kucha, revising the dating by earlier German archaeologists.

=== Teaching ===
When Peking University established its Department of Archaeology in 1983, Su was named its first head. Many of his students became renowned archaeologists, including Hang Kan (杭侃), head of the School of Archaeology and Museology of Peking University; Zhang Zhongpei, president of the Palace Museum; Fan Jinshi, president of the Dunhuang Research Academy; An Jiayao, fellow of the Institute of Archaeology, Chinese Academy of Social Sciences and head of its Xi'an Station. He retired in 2004 after a career lasting more than 50 years.

He was known as a strict teacher and a meticulous scholar. Even after Fan Jinshi gained renown as an expert, Su disapproved of the first drafts of her archaeological report on the Dunhuang Grottoes. It took another five years' revision before the report was finally published in 2011.

== Book collection ==
In addition to his archaeological work, Su was a bibliographer and book collector. Three out of the four rooms in his home, except for the bedroom, were occupied by his book collection, which by 2010 had exceeded 10,000 volumes and included many rare books. In that year he donated all his books to the Peking University Library, which established the Su Bai Reading Room to host the collection.

== Death ==
On 1 February 2018, Su Bai died in Beijing, at the age of 95.
