= The Governor's Wife Offering =

Mural created during the Tang dynasty

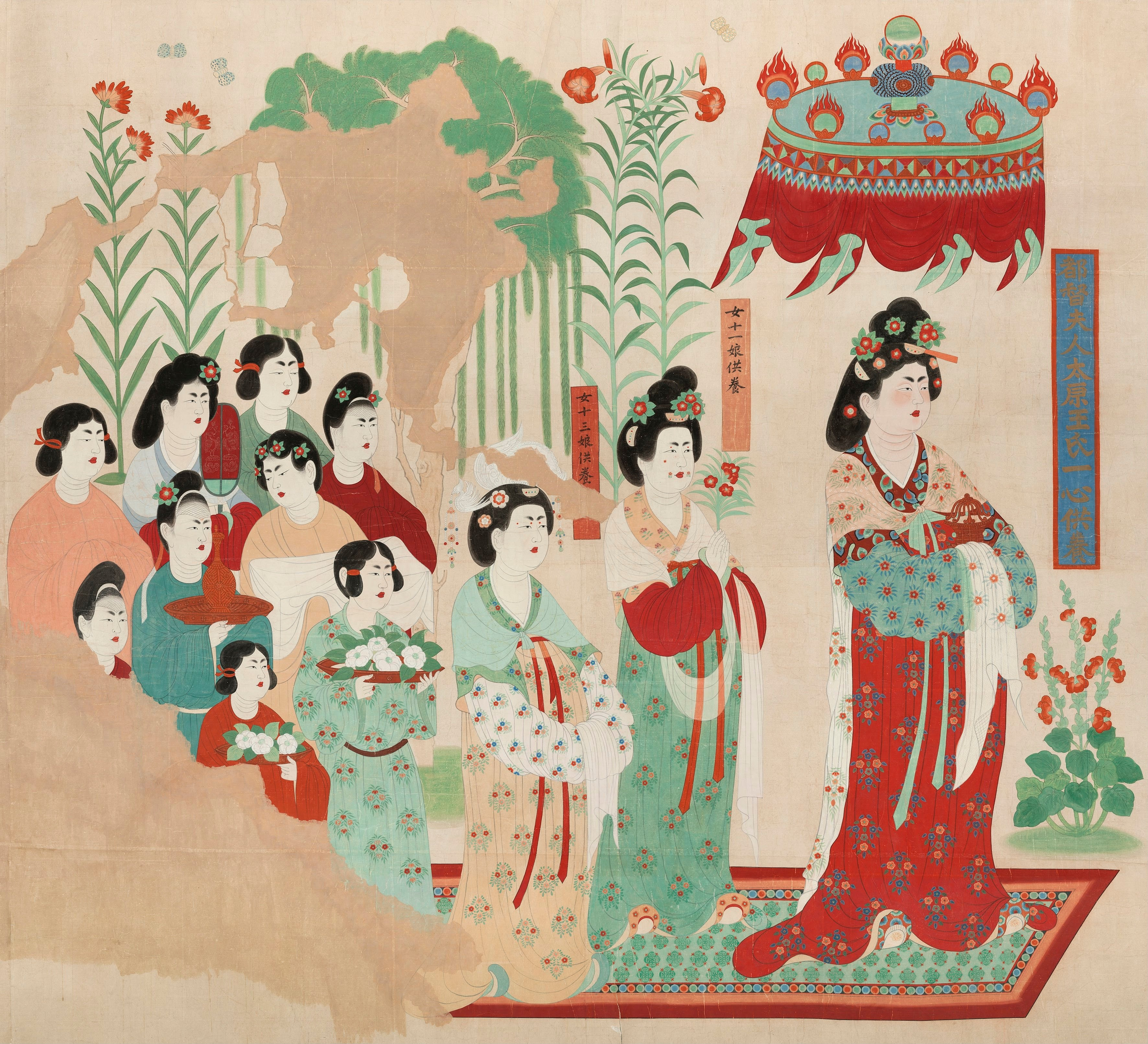
- Artist: Unknown
- Year: Tang dynasty
- Type: Mural
- Location: Cave 130, Mogao Caves, Dunhuang

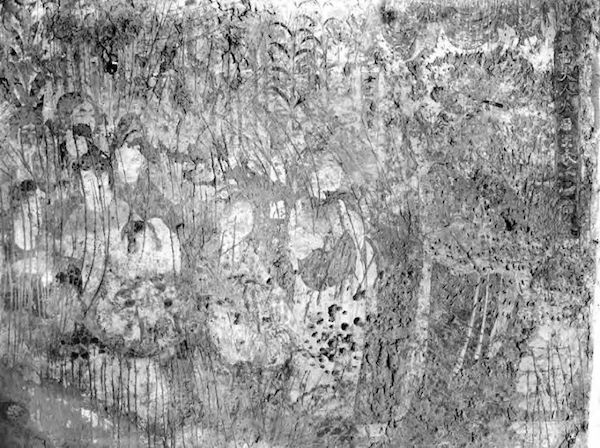
Original mural, photographed by Luo Jimei (罗寄梅) in 1943.

The Governor's Wife Offering (Chinese: 都督夫人太原王氏礼佛图) is a large portrait mural on the southern wall of the corridor in Cave 130, Mogao Caves, Dunhuang, created by an unknown artist during the Tianbao era of the Tang dynasty (early 8th century). The original work has been severely damaged, and what is seen now is a restoration copy by Duan Wenjie, a former director of the Dunhuang Academy.

== Introduction ==
Madam Governor Wang clan of Taiyuan was the wife of Le Tinggui (樂庭瓌), who served as the governor of Jinchang Prefecture around the twelfth year of the Tianbao era (753 AD). From right to left are Madam Governor and her two daughters (Shiyi Niang and Shisan Niang), along with nine maidservants.

The original mural was covered by murals from the Western Xia period. In the 1940s, it was peeled away by a visitor and exposed to sunlight, resulting in severe damage to the mural.

== In popular culture ==
- The 2018 CCTV program National Treasure (Season 2) featured the costume show "Guantang" (观唐), recreated by Chu Yan and her team.
- The dance Worshiping Buddha Lady (礼佛夫人) , from the 2021 Hanfu Spring Festival Gala.
