= Wang Xudong =

Wang Xudong may refer to:

- Wang Xudong (politician) (born 1946), Chinese politician
- Wang Xudong (curator) (born 1967), curator of the Palace Museum, China
