= Chang Shana =

Chinese painter

- 常沙娜
- Born: March 1931 (age 95); Lyon, France
- Education: Art School of the Museum of Fine Arts, Boston
- Occupation: Painter
- Years active: 1951–present
- Notable work: Great Hall of the People; Cultural Palace of Nationalities
- Political party: Chinese Communist Party
- Parent(s): Chang Shuhong; Chen Zhixiu

Chang Shana (Chinese: 常沙娜; pinyin: Cháng Shānà; born March 1931) is a Chinese painter best known for participating in the design of the Great Hall of the People, Cultural Palace of Nationalities, and the Museum of the Chinese Communist Party. She was a member of the China Artists Association.

== Biography ==
Chang was born in Lyon, France, in March 1931, to Chang Shuhong, a Manchu painter, and Chen Zhixiu, her father's cousin and alma mater of Beaux-Arts de Paris. The name "Shana" is a transliteration of the Saône River in France's Lyon. She returned to China with her parents in 1937, the year the Second Sino-Japanese War broke out. After Beijing was occupied by the Imperial Japanese Army and Chang and her mother fled to different cities to take refuge. Finally, they settled in southwest China's Chongqing, where the National Peking School of Fine Arts had relocated. In 1942, Chang Shuhong became the vice head of the preparatory committee of the newly founded National Dunhuang Art Institute in northwest China's Gansu province, and later served as its first president. In the spring of 1945, her mother divorced with her father due to she could no longer bear local living conditions. From 1945 to 1948, she and her father studied and copied Dunhuang murals. In 1948, under the financial support of a Canadian woman teaching in China, she pursued advanced studies in the United States, studying drawing, human anatomy, art history, painting, and design at the Art School of the Museum of Fine Arts, Boston.

She returned to China in December 1950 and taught at the Department of Construction, Tsinghua University. She also worked as an assistant of Lin Huiyin. In 1952, the Chinese Communist Party (CCP) regrouped China's higher education institutions, she was transferred to the Department of Applied Art, Central Academy of Fine Arts as an assistant. Three years later, the department was elevated to the Central Academy of Art and Design (now Academy of Arts & Design, Tsinghua University), becoming the top university for Chinese craft and design, and she successively worked as lecturer, associate professor, and professor. She joined the CCP in 1964. During the Cultural Revolution, she suffered political persecution due to her background of being born in France and studying in the United States. She was sent to the May Seventh Cadre Schools to do farm works in the neighboring Hebei province. She returned to Beijing in late Cultural Revolution. After the reform and opening up, she was promoted to vice president of the Central Academy of Art and Design in 1982. One year later she was promoted again to become its present and held the post for 15 years.

She was a delegate to the 12th and 13th National Congress of the Chinese Communist Party. She was a deputy to the 7th, 8th and 9th National People's Congress.

== Personal life ==
Chang married her first husband at the age of 22, but divorced very soon. Ten years later, she married again to translator Cui Taishan. She gave birth to a child by age 45.
