= Museum of the Communist Party of China =

Museum in Beijing, China

- 中国共产党历史展览馆
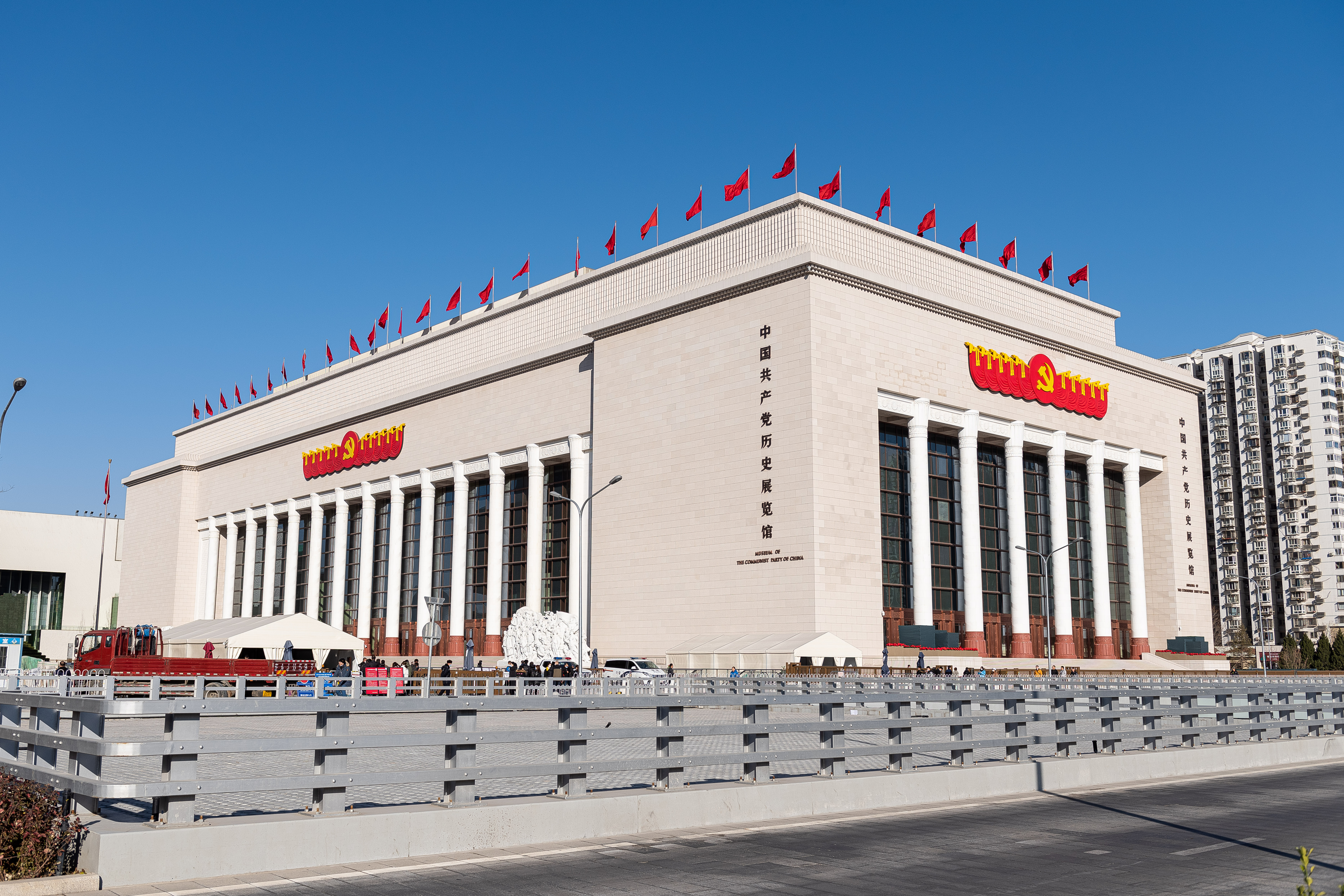
- The museum in 2021
- Established: 18 June 2021 (in operation); 15 July 2021 (opened to the public)
- Location: Chaoyang District, Beijing, China
- Type: History museum
- Collection size: 4,548 pieces or sets
- Founder: Central Committee of the Chinese Communist Party
- Owner: Central Propaganda Department of the Chinese Communist Party
- Website: www.cpcmuseum.cn

Chinese name
- Simplified Chinese: 中国共产党历史展览馆
- Traditional Chinese: 中國共產黨歷史展覽館
Transcriptions
Standard Mandarin
- Hanyu Pinyin: Zhōngguó gòngchǎndǎng Lìshĭ Zhǎnlǎnguǎn

The Museum of the Communist Party of China is located at the intersection of Beichen East Road and Datun North Road, in Chaoyang District of Beijing, China. It is adjacent to the Olympic Green. The museum is managed by the Central Propaganda Department of the Chinese Communist Party.

== History ==
After the 19th National Congress of the Chinese Communist Party, the Central Committee of the Chinese Communist Party decided to build a museum to fully display the history of the Chinese Communist Party (CCP). A total of seven design units received the design task, three were shortlisted, and the final winner was the scheme of Beijing Institute of Architectural Design Co., Ltd.. The construction project started on September 10, 2018, and was completed on May 5, 2021. More than 200 units and nearly 50,000 people participated.

On June 18, 2021, the museum officially opened. That same day, Xi Jinping, Li Keqiang, Li Zhanshu, Wang Yang, Wang Huning, Zhao Leji, Han Zheng, Wang Qishan and other party and state leaders visited the museum and reviewed the Chinese Communist Party Admission Oath.

Xi was a driving force in establishing the museum, consistent with his view that it is important to "enhance Party cadres' and members' belief in Marxism and communism, their belief in socialism with Chinese characteristics, and their confidence in the great rejuvenation of the Chinese nation."

The museum aims to be "a spiritual home and shrine for Communists' education and purification."

== Collections ==
There are 4,548 pieces or sets of cultural relics on permanent display in the museum, including 420 original state-level cultural relics, such as Karl Marx's Brussel IV notebook, Mao Zedong's coat and hat worn at the Proclamation of the People's Republic of China, the first Five-Star Red Flag of China raised by pressing the button, Mao Zedong's drafting and Zhou Enlai's handwritten inscription on the Monument to the People's Heroes, Li Dazhao's autobiography after his arrest and the gallows for his death, Chen Wangdao's translation of The Communist Manifesto and the Old Summer Palace bronze heads.

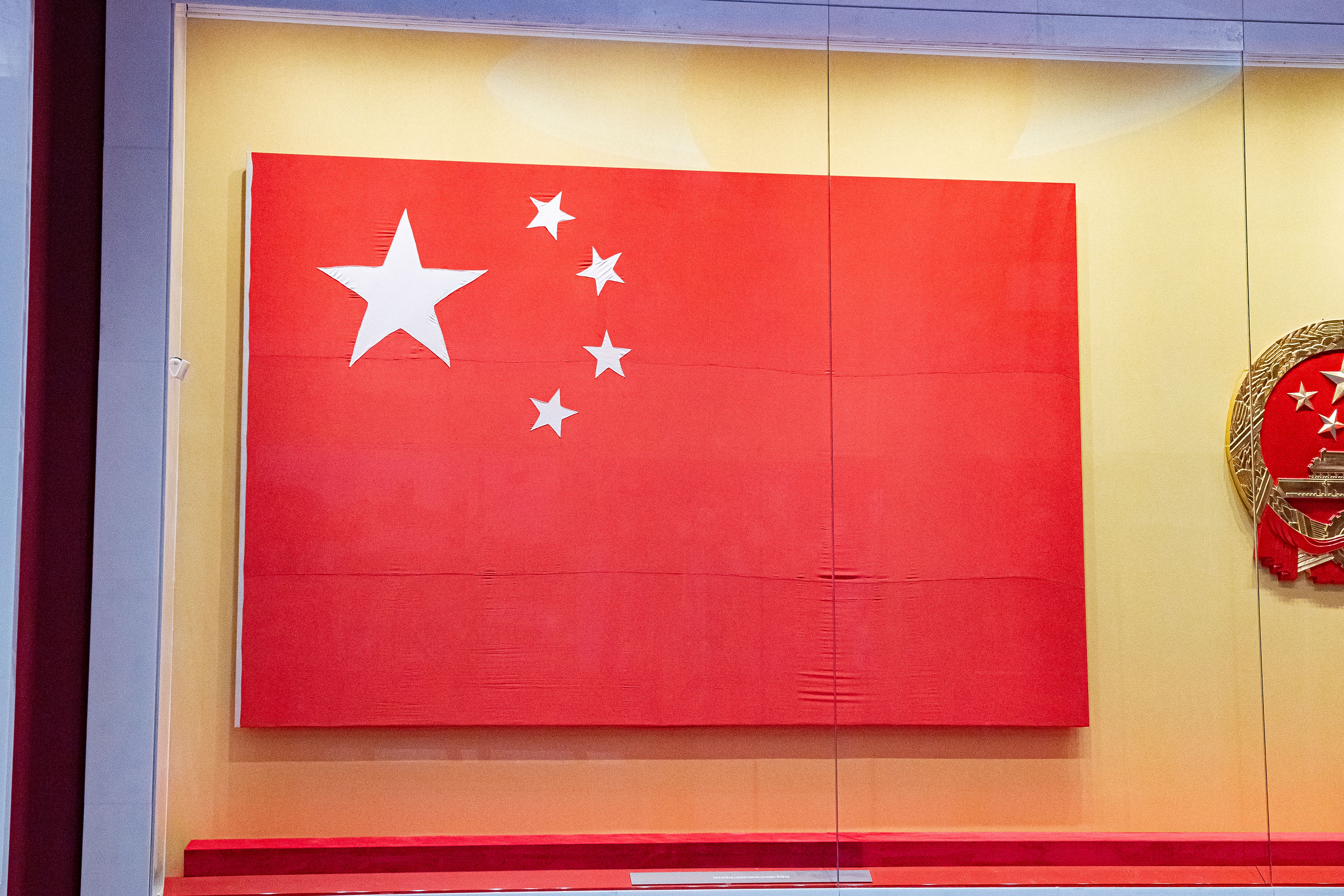
First flag of the People's Republic hoisted at founding ceremony

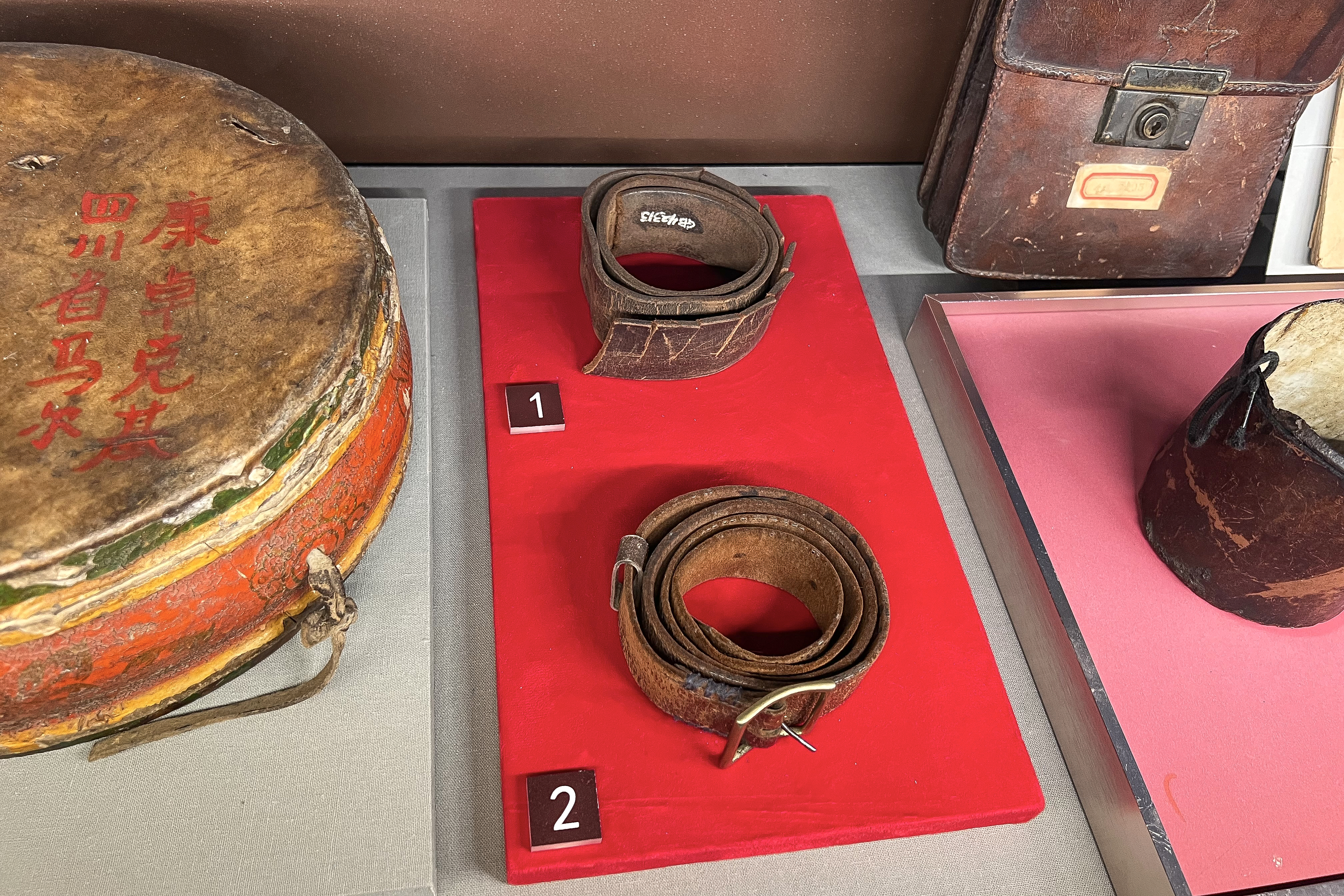
Uneaten remainders of two belts from the Long March

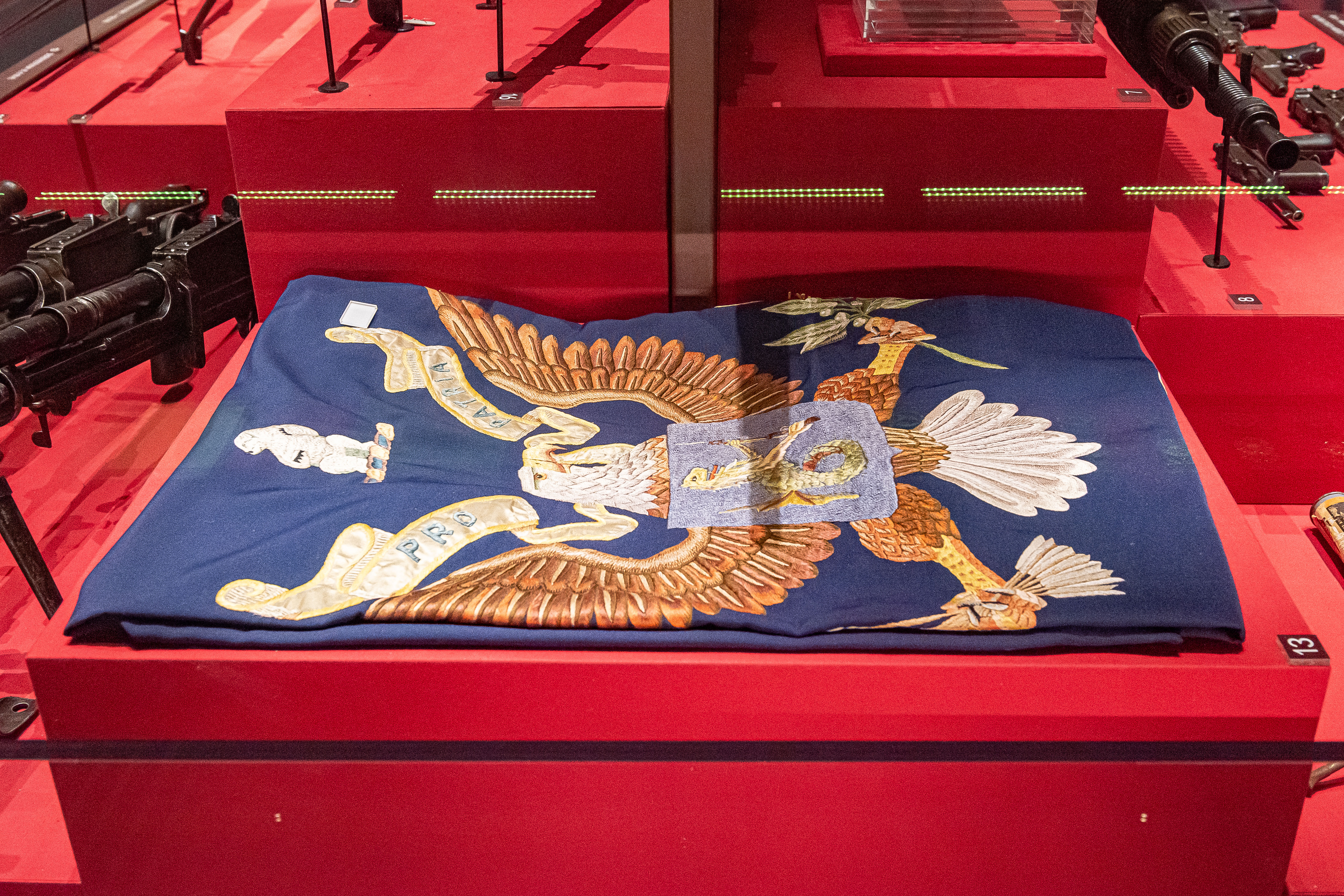
Seized flag of the US Army 31st Infantry Regiment

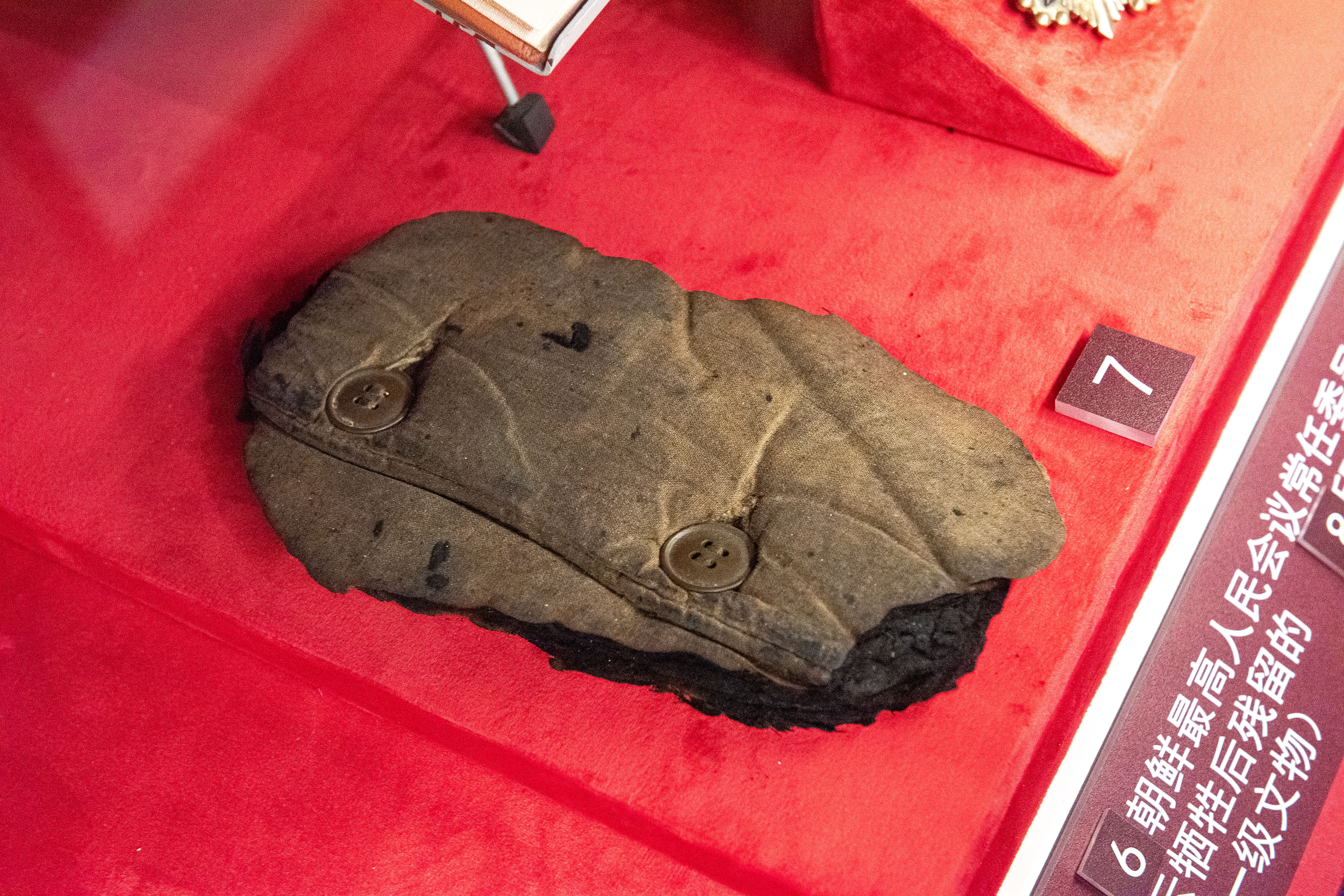
Remains of Qiu Shaoyun's charred clothes

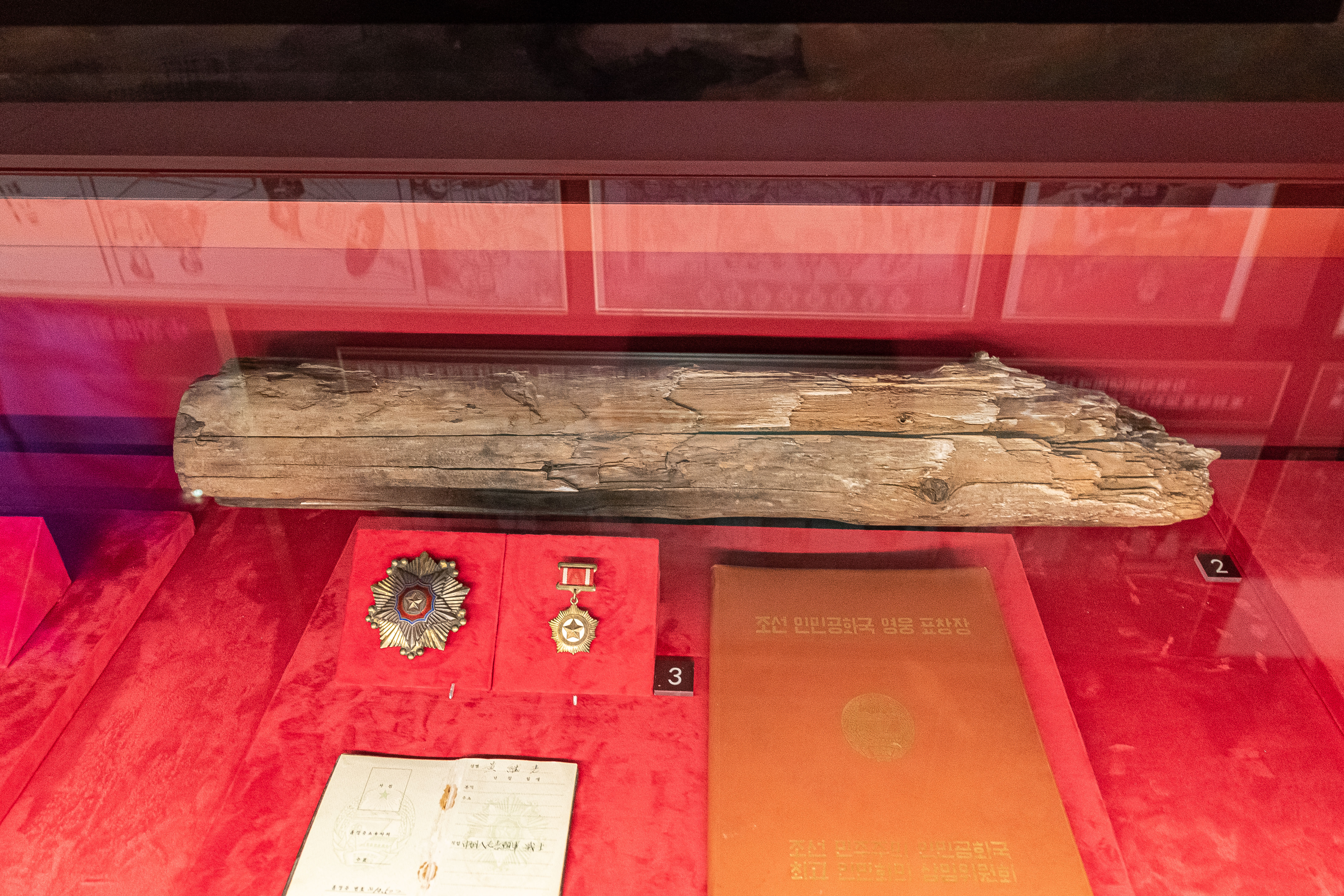
Bunker wood from the sacrifice of Huang Jiguang

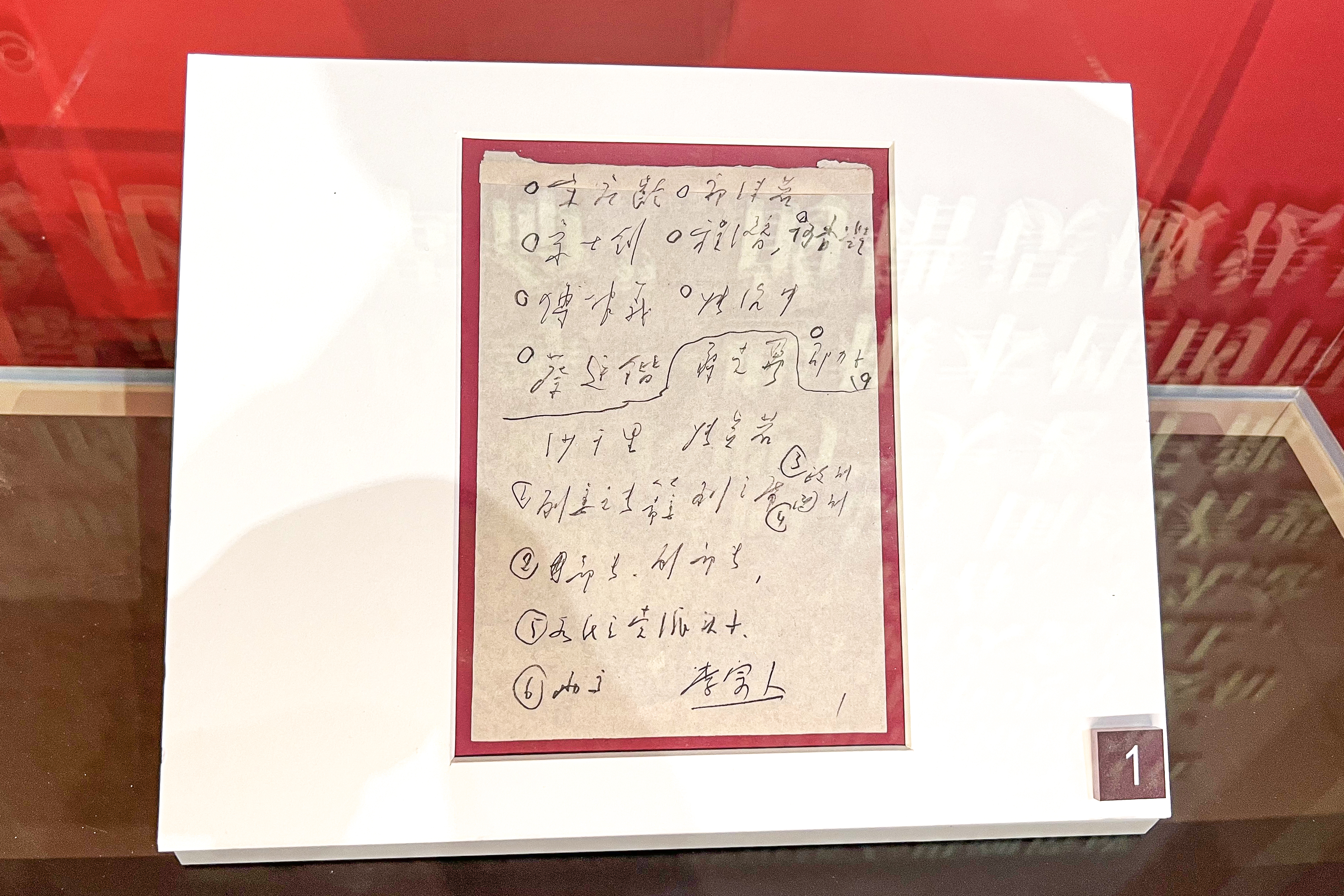
Zhou Enlai's list of cadres to be protected (1966)

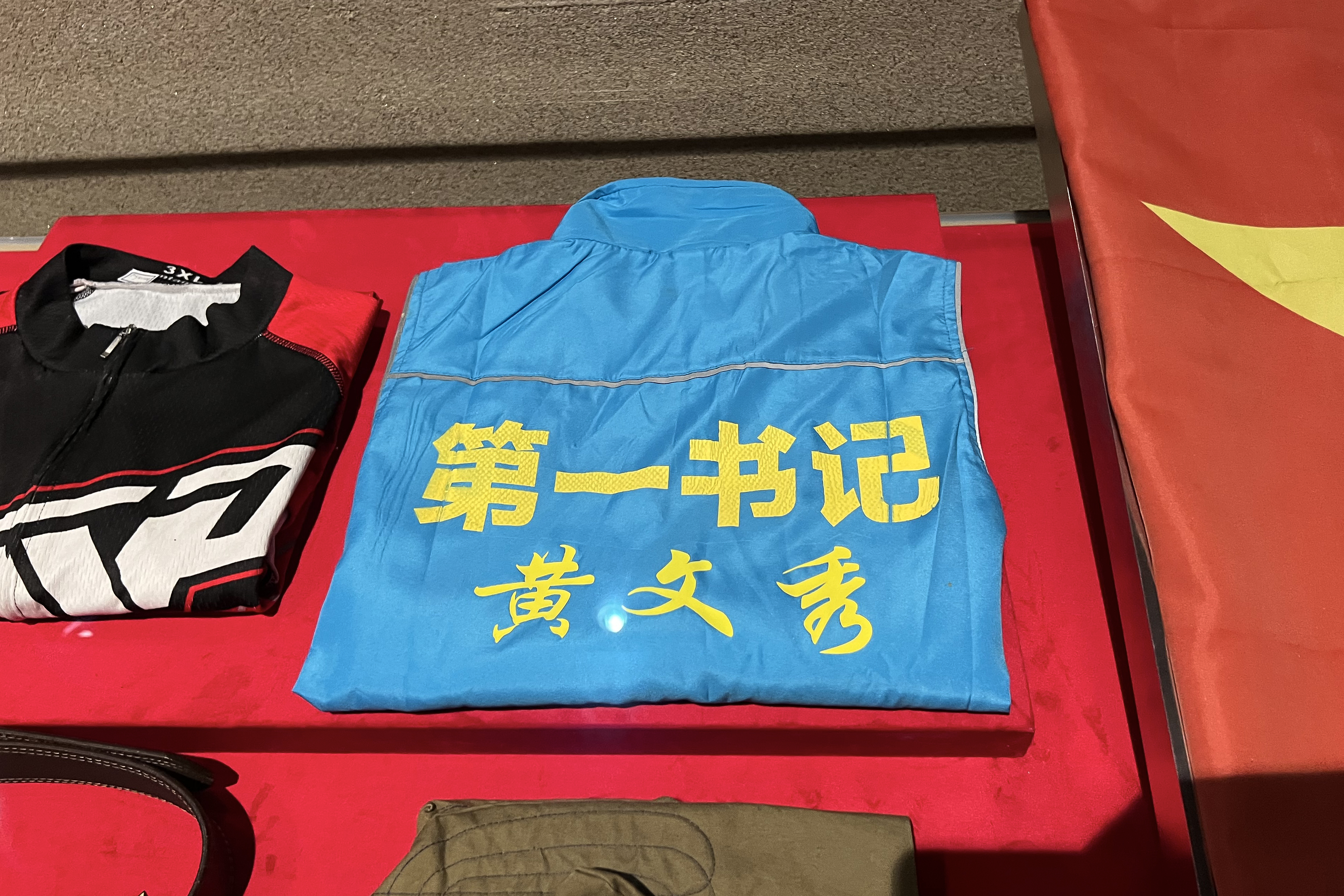
Vest worn by Huang Wenxiu

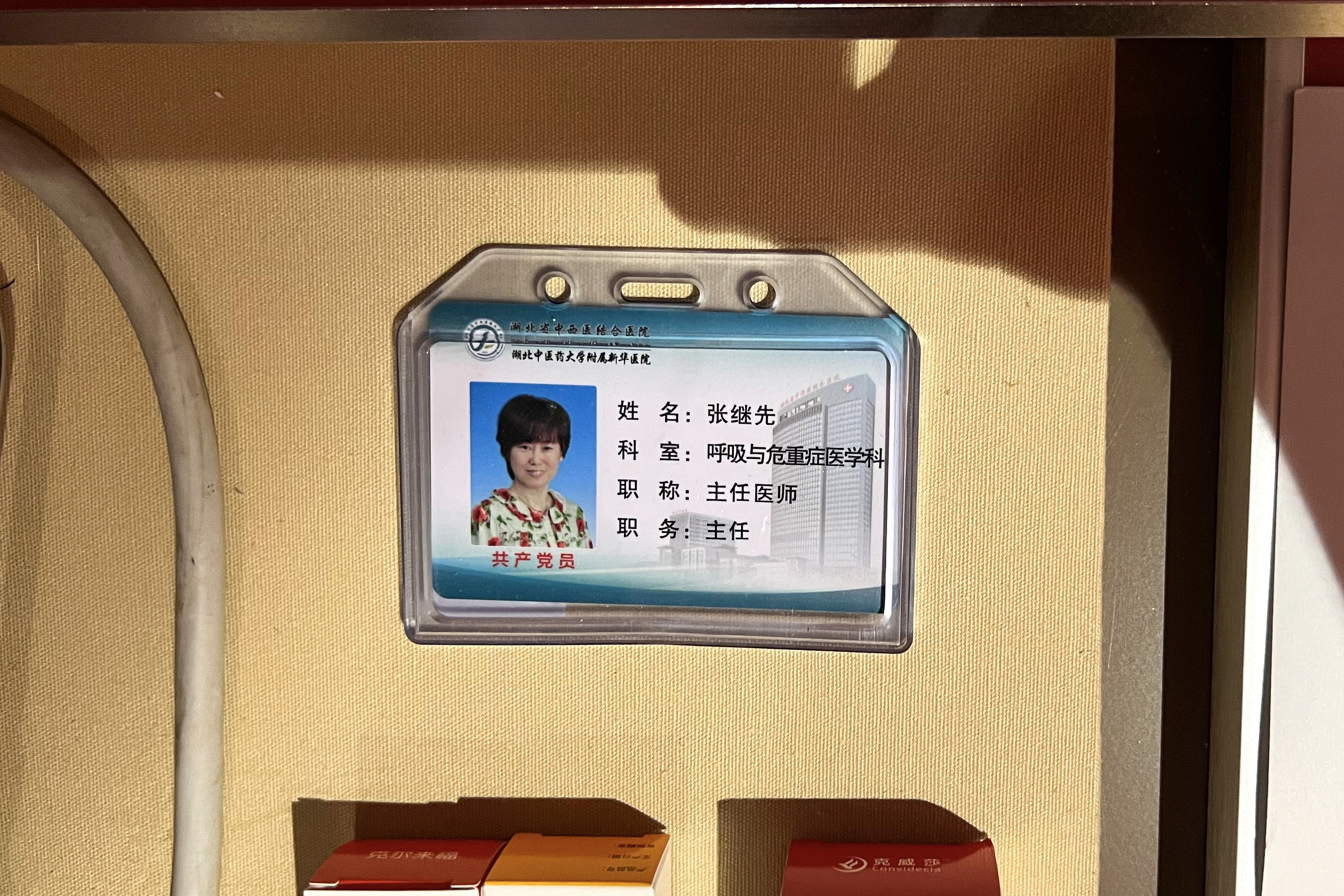
Doctor's ID card of Zhang Jixian

== Architecture ==
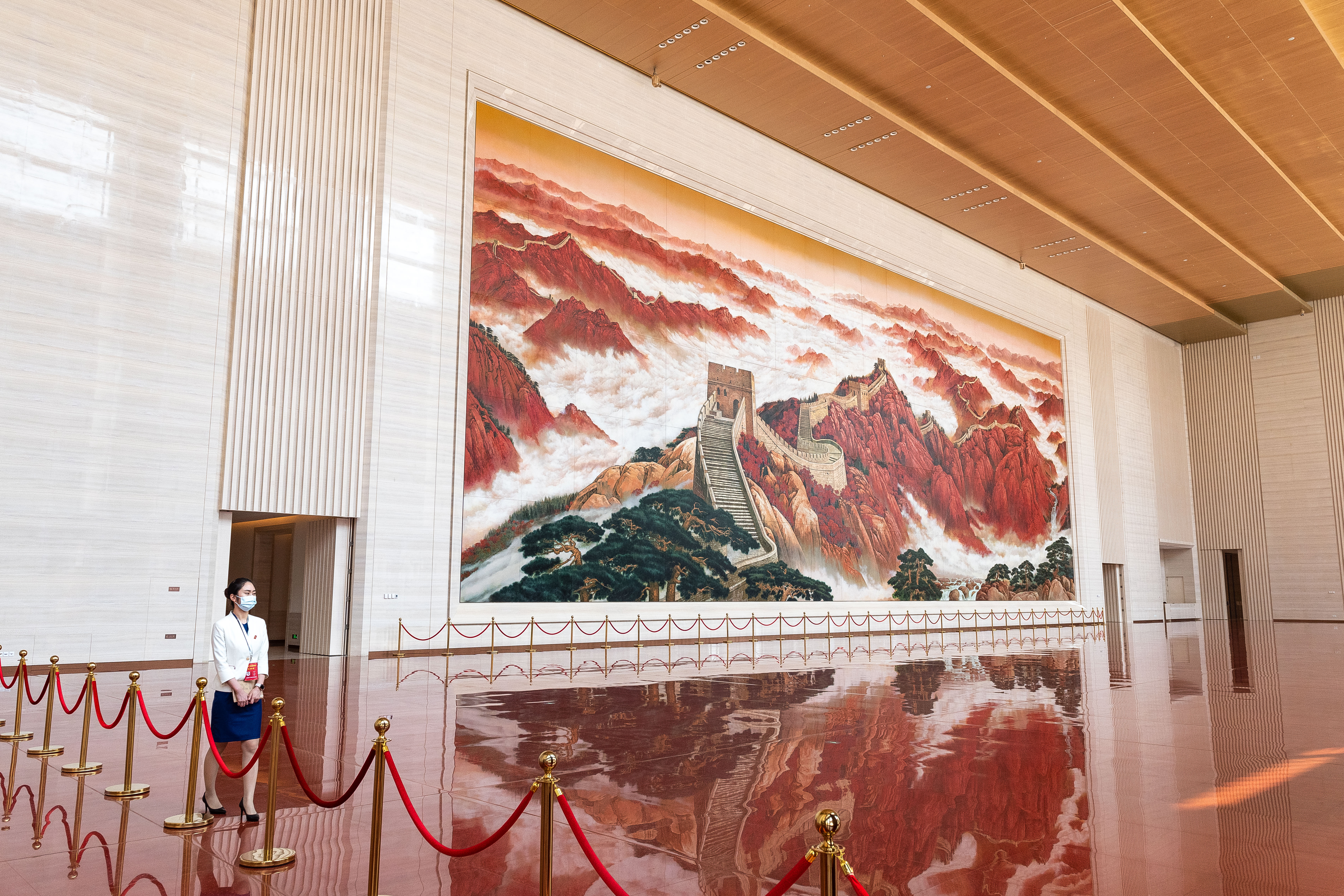
Museum lobby and painting Ode to the Great Wall

The main building area of the museum is nearly 150,000 square metres (1,600,000 sq ft), of which nearly two-thirds is exhibition space. From the birds-eye view, the museum shows the Chinese character "工" shape as a whole, which means that the CCP is the vanguard of the Chinese working class, and also the vanguard of the Chinese people and the Chinese nation. The appearance adopts the traditional colonnade structure, which fully inherits the traditional essence of Chinese architecture. There are 28 pillars on the east and west sides of the museum, symbolizing the 28 years from the founding of the CCP in 1921 to the proclamation of the People's Republic of China in 1949. There are six pillars on both sides of the north and the south.

Chang Shana, who participated in the design of the Great Hall of the People and the Cultural Palace of Nationalities, personally led the team to design the chapiters, pedestals, architraves, lattice walls, copper doors and emblem of the museum.

It has a dedicated hall for CCP members to renew their oaths.

=== Lobby ===
In the lobby of the museum, there is a 600-metre (2,000 ft) lacquer painting of Ode to the Great Wall (长城颂), which is made up of 100 lacquer boards. It was created by Cheng Xiangjun (程向军), a professor at the School of Arts of Tsinghua University.
