= Shan Jixiang =

Chinese politician, scholar and architect

- 单霁翔
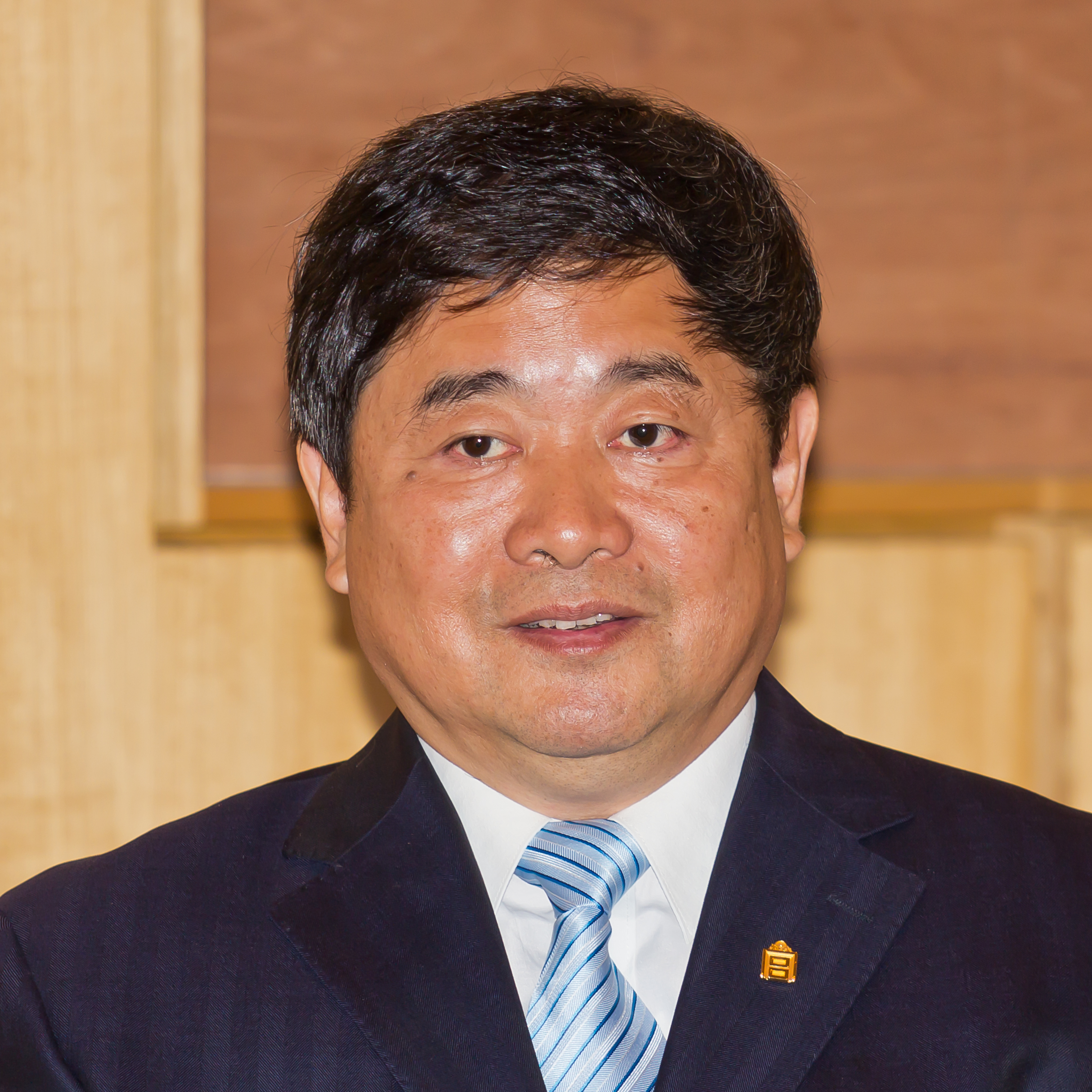
- Shan Jixiang

Curator of the Palace Museum
- In office January 2012 – 8 April 2019
- Preceded by: Zheng Xinmiao
- Succeeded by: Wang Xudong

Director of the National Cultural Heritage Administration
- In office August 2002 – January 2012
- Preceded by: Zhang Wenbin
- Succeeded by: Li Xiaojie

Communist Party Secretary of Fangshan District
- In office August 1997 – January 2000
- Preceded by: Li Qingyu
- Succeeded by: Wang Fengjiang

Personal details
- Born: July 1954 (age 72) Jiangning County, Jiangsu, China
- Party: Chinese Communist Party
- Education: Tsinghua University

Chinese name
- Traditional Chinese: 單霽翔
- Simplified Chinese: 单霁翔
Transcriptions
Standard Mandarin
- Hanyu Pinyin: Shàn Jìxiáng
- Wade–Giles: Shan Chi-hsiang

Shan Jixiang (Chinese: 单霁翔; born July 1954) is a Chinese politician, scholar, architect, serves as Dean of Gugong Academy of the Palace Museum. He served as curator of the Palace Museum between 2012 and 2019 and formerly as Director of the National Cultural Heritage Administration.

Shan was a member of the 10th, 11th and 12th National Committees of the Chinese People's Political Consultative Conference (CPPCC), president of Cultural Relics Society of China, and vice chairman of the Architectural Society of China.

== Biography ==
Shan was born in Jiangning County, Jiangsu in July 1954. He graduated from Tsinghua University, where he studied urban planning and design under Wu Liangyong. Shan started his research on the conservation and planning of historical cities and cultural heritage areas while studying in Japan from 1980 to 1984.

Shan Jixiang entered the workforce in January 1971 and joined the Chinese Communist Party (CCP) in June 1985.

Shan was deputy director of the Beijing Municipal Urban Planning Administration from January 1992 to May 1994, and director and Chinese Communist Party Committee Secretary of the Beijing Municipal Administration of Cultural Heritage from May 1994 to August 1997. He was CCP chief of Fangshan District in August 1997, and held that office until January 2000. He became the CCP branch secretary and director of Beijing Municipal Planning Commission in January 2001, and served until August 2002. In August 2002 he was promoted to become director of the National Cultural Heritage Administration and a member of the CCP committee of the Ministry of Culture. In January 2012 he was appointed curator of the Palace Museum, replacing Zheng Xinmiao.

In December 2018 he was hired as senior professor of Southeast University.

According to a public announcement from the Palace Museum, Shan Jixiang retired on April 8, 2019, succeeded by the director of Dunhuang Research Academy, Wang Xudong.

== Works ==
- Secure Palace Museum – Thoughts and Practice: Collected Works of the Renchen Year. Beijing: Palace Museum Publishing House. 2013.
- Cultural Heritage – Thoughts and Practice. Tianjin: Tianjin University Press. 2012.
- From "Gallery Space" to "Boundless Universe": Contemplating the Museum in a Broader Sense. Tianjin: Tianjin University Press. 2011.
- Retaining the "Root" and "Soul" of Urban Culture: The Exploration and Practice on Preserving China's Cultural Heritage. Beijing: Science Press. 2010.
- Cultural Heritage Conservation and Urban Culture Renaissance. Beijing: China Architecture and Building Press. 2009.
- Entering the World of Cultural Landscape Heritage. Tianjin: Tianjin University Press. 2009.
- From "Cultural Relics Preservation" to "Cultural Heritage Protection". Tianjin: Tianjin University Press. 2008.
- From "Functional City" to "Cultural City". Tianjin: Tianjin University Press. 2007.
- Urban Development and Cultural Heritage Preservation. Tianjin: Tianjin University Press. 2006.

Party political offices
Preceded by Li Qingyu (李庆余)	Communist Party Secretary of Fangshan District; 1997–2002	Succeeded by Wang Fengjiang (王凤江)
Government offices
Preceded by Zhang Wenbin	Director of the National Cultural Heritage Administration; 2002–2012	Succeeded by Li Xiaojie (励小捷)
Preceded by Zheng Xinmiao	Curator of the Palace Museum; 2012–2019	Succeeded by Wang Xudong
