= Zheng Xinmiao =

Chinese politician and scholar (born 1947)

- 郑欣淼
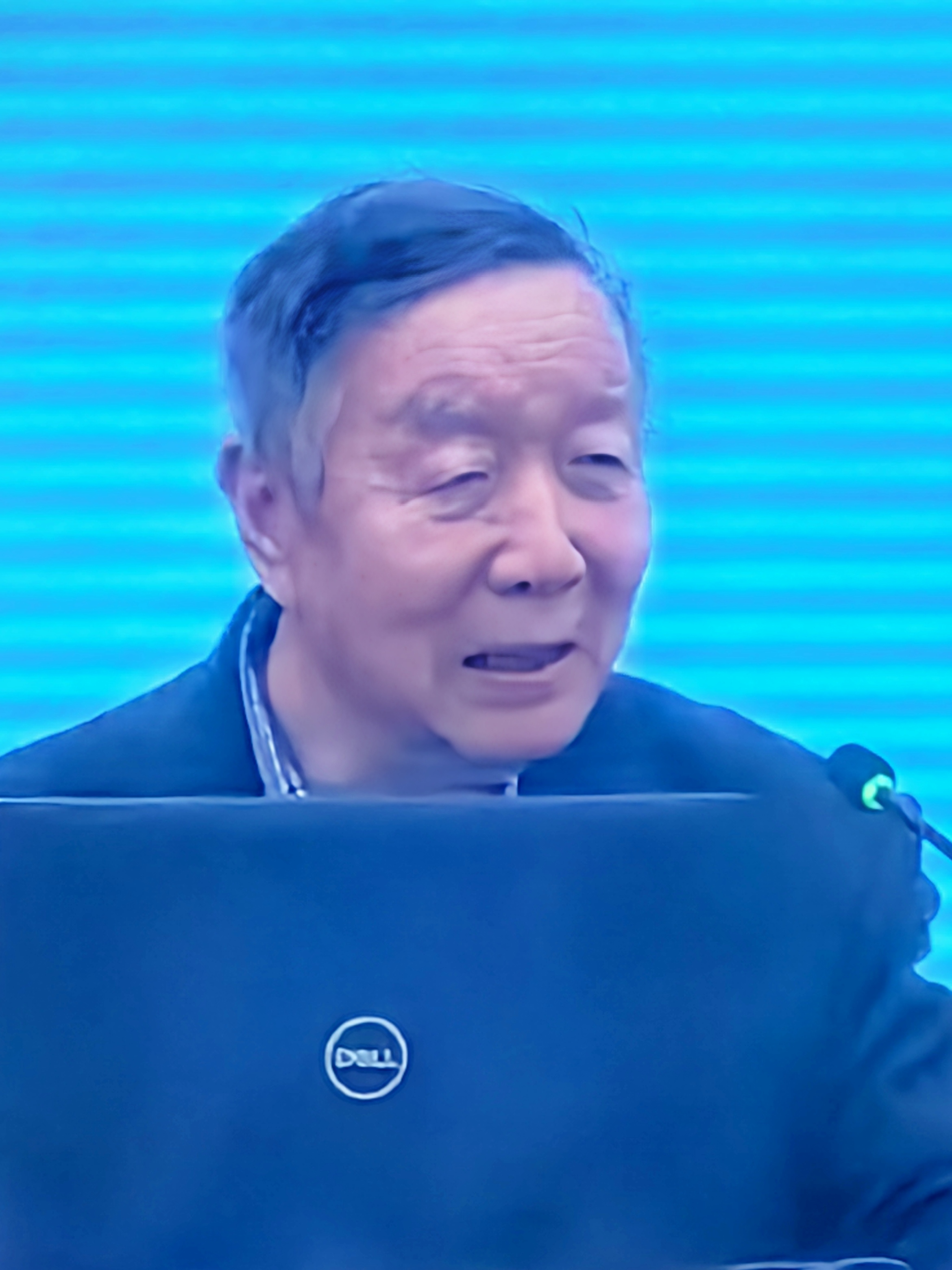
- Zheng Xinmiao (2024)

President of Palace Museum Research Institute
- Incumbent
- Assumed office 2013
- Preceded by: New title

Director of the Palace Museum
- In office 2003–2012
- Preceded by: Zhang Zhongpei
- Succeeded by: Shan Jixiang

Personal details
- Born: Zheng Xinmiao (郑鑫淼); October 1947 (age 78–79) Chengcheng County, Shaanxi, China
- Party: Chinese Communist Party
- Education: Northwest University

Chinese name
- Traditional Chinese: 鄭欣淼
- Simplified Chinese: 郑欣淼
Transcriptions
Standard Mandarin
- Hanyu Pinyin: Zhèng Xīnmiào

Zheng Xinmiao (Chinese: 郑欣淼; born October 1947) is a Chinese politician and scholar.

== Biography ==
Zheng was born Zheng Xinmiao (Chinese: 郑鑫淼) in Chengcheng County, Shaanxi, in October 1947. He joined the Chinese Communist Party in January 1970 and entered the workforce in July 1970. From July 1970 to July 1975 he worked in his home-county. He worked in Weinan Municipal Government between July 1975 and October 1977. He served in various posts in the Shaanxi Provincial Government before serving as leader of the Cultural Group of the Policy Research Office of the Central Committee of the Chinese Communist Party in October 1977. He was vice-governor of Qinghai in September 1995, and held that office until October 1998, when he was appointed deputy director of the National Cultural Heritage Administration. In September 2002 he was promoted to become vice-minister of culture, a position he held until November 2008. He became curator of the Palace Museum in September 2003, and served until January 2012. In September 2013 he became president of the newly established Palace Museum Research Institute.

Government offices
Preceded by Zhang Zhongpei	Director of the Palace Museum; 2003–2012	Succeeded by Shan Jixiang
New title	President of Palace Museum Research Institute; 2013	Incumbent
