= Zhang Jixian =

Chinese doctor (born 1966)

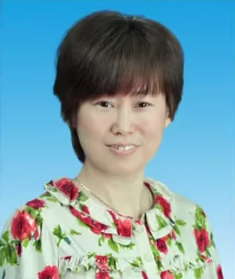
- Born: 1966 (age 59–60); Huangzhou, Hubei, China
- Education: Department of Clinical Medicine, Hubei Medical University
- Known for: Discovering the SARS‑CoV‑2
- Medical career
- Profession: Master of Medicine, Professor
- Field: Pulmonology
- Institutions: Hubei Provincial Hospital of Integrated Chinese & Western Medicine

Chinese name
- Simplified Chinese: 张继先
- Traditional Chinese: 張繼先
Transcriptions
Standard Mandarin
- Hanyu Pinyin: Zhāng Jìxiān

Zhang Jixian (simplified Chinese: 张继先; traditional Chinese: 張繼先; pinyin: Zhāng Jìxiān, born 1966) is a Chinese pulmonologist. She is known to have discovered SARS‑CoV‑2, and was the director of the Department of Respiratory Medicine of Hubei Provincial Hospital of Integrated Chinese & Western Medicine. She is also a member of the Chinese Communist Party.

== Career ==
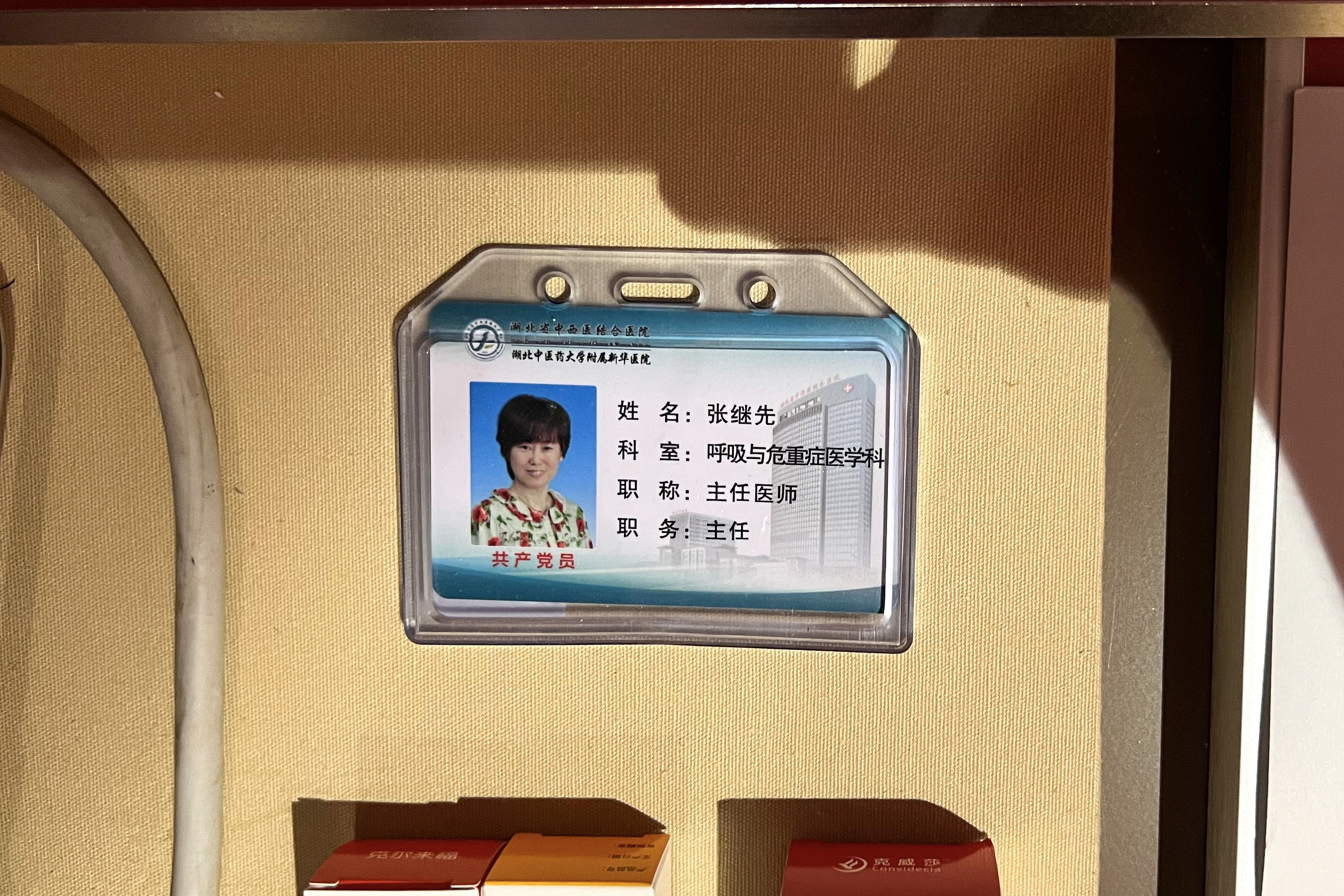
ID card of Zhang Jixian on display at the Communist Party Museum

Zhang Jixian was admitted to Hubei Medical University (now Wuhan University School of Medicine) in 1985, graduated from clinical medicine in July 1989, and started working. During the SARS epidemic in 2003, Zhang Jixian, who had been engaged in clinical work for 14 years, was a member of the Jianghan District expert group. During this period, she developed a strong awareness of disease prevention. In 2005, she became the deputy director of the Department of Respiratory Medicine of Hubei Provincial Hospital of Integrated Chinese & Western Medicine. In 2009, after separation of the Department of Respiratory Medicine and Department of Gastroenterology, she became the director of Department of Respiratory Medicine.

During the COVID-19 pandemic, abnormal pneumonia of unknown cause was found on December 26, 2019. The situation was reported to Hubei Provincial Hospital of Integrated Chinese & Western Medicine on December 27. The hospital then reported to the Wuhan Jianghan District Center for Disease Control and Prevention. A similar case was reported for the second time on December 28 and 29. A new type of coronavirus was detected on December 31 in 6 patients with alveolar lavage. On February 6, 2020, Zhang Jixian was commended by Wuhan Human Resources and Social Security Bureau, Hubei Provincial Human Resources and Social Security Department, and Hubei Provincial Health Commission. Xinhua News Agency commented that Zhang Jixian "is the 'leader' in the frontline of hospital treatment." In November of the same year, Zhang Jixian was rated as the National Advanced Worker.
