= Fan Jinshi =

Chinese archaeologist

- 樊锦诗

3rd Director of Dunhuang Research Academy
- In office April 1998 – December 2014
- Preceded by: Duan Wenjie
- Succeeded by: Wang Xudong

Personal details
- Born: July 1938 (age 88) Beijing, China
- Party: Chinese Communist Party
- Spouse: Peng Jinzhang (m. 1966–2017)
- Children: 1
- Education: Peking University
- Occupation: Archaeologist, heritage specialist

Chinese name
- Traditional Chinese: 樊錦詩
- Simplified Chinese: 樊锦诗
Transcriptions
Standard Mandarin
- Hanyu Pinyin: Fán Jǐnshī

Fan Jinshi (Chinese: 樊锦诗; born July 1938) is a Chinese archaeologist and heritage specialist who served as director of the Dunhuang Research Academy between 1998 and 2014. She spends most of her life in Mogao Caves, Dunhuang, currently working as an honorary president and professional researcher in Dunhuang Research Academy, as well as a part-time professor and a doctoral supervisor in Lanzhou University. Fan began working in Dunhuang in 1963, at the age of 25. She has been venerated as "Daughter of Dunhuang" for her over 50 years of devotion to studying and preserving the Dunhuang Grottoes. She was an early proponent of the Dunhuang Academy in contemporary China, and pioneered a series of effective preservation approaches for grottos.

She was a delegate to the 13th National Congress of the Chinese Communist Party. She was a member of the 8th, 9th and 10th National Committee of the Chinese People's Political Consultative Conference.

== Biography ==
=== Early life ===
Fan was born in Beijing and was raised in Shanghai. Her ancestral home is in Hangzhou, Zhejiang. Her given name, Jinshi, means "beautiful poetry" in Chinese. Her father was a graduate of Tsinghua University and was reportedly passionate about Chinese classical art and culture, a passion he passed on to Fan.

=== Education ===
Fan Jinshi graduated from School of Archaeology and Museology(previously under the Department of History) in Peking University in 1963. Fan first visited Dunhuang in 1962, on a school-organized trip to the Dunhuang Institute of Cultural Relics (now Dunhuang Academy). Su Bai, a veteran archaeologist at Peking University, was reportedly an instructor and mentor to her during her time at the university.

=== Career ===
After graduation, she was dispatched to Dunhuang, where she worked in the Dunhuang Institute of Cultural Relics (now Dunhuang Research Academy). At the time of her arrival, the academy's headquarters was not a comfortable place to live and did not have electricity or running water.

In August 1984 she became deputy director of the Dunhuang Research Academy, rising to Director in April 1998, after 35 years of service at the institute. In January 2015 she became the honorary director. She also served as a part-time professor and doctoral supervisor at Lanzhou University.

According to colleagues, Fan reportedly once said that her greatest wish is to recover the Dunhuang manuscripts lost abroad and house them in a museum at Dunhuang.

== Personal life ==
Fan married her university classmate Peng Jinzhang (Chinese: 彭金章; 1937–2017) in 1966. He was also an archaeologist. Reportedly, as Fan's flourishing career kept the couple apart, Peng resigned his position as deputy director in the Department of History at Wuhan University in 1986 in order to live closer to her. Fan has been quoted as saying that "...[my husband] knew that I couldn't live without Dunhuang. He made sacrifices." The couple has a son.

== Works ==
- Fan Jinshi et al. (2002). The Regulations for the Conservation of the Mogao Caves in Dunhuang, Gansu Province.
- Fan Jinshi; Zhao Shengliang (2009). The Art of Mogao Grottoes in Dunhuang: A Journey Into China's Buddhist Shrine.
- Fan Jinshi (2013). The Caves of Dunhuang. Scala Arts Publishers Inc. ISBN 9781857598742.
- Fan Jinshi; Willow Weilan (2013). Dunhuang: Buddhist Art at the Gateway of the Silk Road: Exhibition April 19 to July 21, 2013.
- Fan Jinshi. Dunhuang Grottoes.
- Fan Jinshi, ed. (2016). 丝绸之路与敦煌文化丛书 [Silk Road and Dunhuang Culture Series] (in Chinese). Nanjing, Jiangsu: Jiangsu Fine Arts Publishing House.
- 莫高窟史话 [Historical Tales of Mogao Grottoes] (in Chinese). Nanjing, Jiangsu: Jiangsu Fine Arts Publishing House. 2016. ISBN 9787534426681.
- Fan Jinshi (2019). Gu Chunfang (ed.). 我心归处是敦煌：樊锦诗自述 [My Heart is in Dunhuang: Readme of Fan Jinshi] (in Chinese). Beijing: Yilin Press. ISBN 9787544779548.
  - Fan Jinshi (2024). Gu Chunfang (ed.). Daughter of Dunhuang: A Memoir of a Mogao Grottoes Researcher. Translated by Bruce Humes. San Francisco: Long River Press. ISBN 9781592652594.
- 解读敦煌 [Interpretation of Dunhuang] (in Chinese). East China Normal University Press. 2016. ISBN 9787567546691.
- Fan Jinshi, ed., et al. The Complete Collection of Dunhuang Grottoes.

== Honors ==
- Fan has received the national honor of "Outstanding Contributor to the Cultural Heritage Preservation" for her substantial contribution to the permanent preservation and sustainable utilization of the Mogao Grottoes in Dunhuang.
- Fan has been awarded the honorary title of "National Advanced Laborer".
- In 2008, Fan was honored as one of the ten distinguished alumni of Peking University.
- In 2018, Fan was awarded the title of "Reform Pioneer".

== Representation in Media ==
=== Opera ===
Fan was the subject of a Shanghai Huju opera called "The Daughter of Dunhuang".

=== Variety Shows ===
Date	English title	Chinese title	Role	Notes
2017	Lingting Dajia	聆听大家	Herself	

Academic offices
Preceded by Duan wenjie (段文杰)	3rd Director of Dunhuang Research Academy; 1998-2014	Succeeded by Wang Xudong
