= Duan Wenjie =

Chinese archeologist, director of the Dunhuang Academy

Duan Wenjie (August 23, 1917 — January 21, 2011) was a Chinese archaeologist. Director of the Dunhuang Academy.

== Biography ==
Born in 1917 in Changle Town, Pengxi County, Suining City, Sichuan Province, and originally from Mianyang, Sichuan Province, he graduated from the Department of Chinese Painting at Chongqing National College of Fine Arts (now the Central Academy of Fine Arts) in 1945 and joined the National Dunhuang Art Institute in July 1946 as Acting Head of the Archaeological Group; in 1950, he became Head of the Fine Arts Group of the Dunhuang Institute of Cultural Relics and acting director of the Dunhuang Institute of Cultural Relics; in 1980, he became First Deputy Director of the Dunhuang Institute of Cultural Relics. He was appointed honorary professor at Tokyo University of the Arts in 1986 and retired as honorary director of the Dunhuang Academy in 1998. He died on January 21, 2011, at 17:00 in Lanzhou at the age of 95. He was buried with his wife, Long Shiying, in Dunhuang.
