= Beijing Cultural Heritage Protection Center =

Chinese grassroots non-profit organization

Beijing Cultural Heritage Protection Center (CHP) is a Chinese grassroots non-profit organization, supporting local communities across China to protect their cultural heritage. CHP works with a small professional staff and a large number of volunteers to fight for the protection of China's tangible and intangible cultural heritage.

== Aims ==
Through capacity building, education, networking, advocacy, publicity, and offering constructive and creative solutions, CHP provides a vehicle for channeling the energies of communities in protecting their heritage.

CHP works to:

- raise awareness of cultural conservation in local communities,
- involve people directly in the oversight and management of their heritage,
- to call attention to and campaign against threats to cultural heritage,
- to press for implementation of and adherence to, at local levels, heritage protection laws and policies,
- to raise the visibility of heritage protection in government planning and in media coverage.
- to stop people who wants to build buildings on the sites of China's cultural artifacts.

== Heritage of cities and towns ==
In the haste of economic development and infrastructure modernization, China's architectural heritage and the attendant traditional ways of life are disappearing. CHP is broadening its urban programs through a “Cultural Action Network” of volunteers to monitor the urban heritage situation in major cities and towns around China, and to coordinate CHP's heritage protection efforts with local governments, communities, and media.

=== Liang Sicheng and Lin Huiyin Residence ===
In 2009, CHP pleaded for preservation of the historic residence. As a result, in 2010, the State Administration of Cultural Heritage designated Liang Sicheng and Lin Huiyin's residence as a protected cultural site.

=== Drum and Bell Tower Neighborhood ===
The area was put at risk when the government announced a plan to convert it into a “Beijing Time Cultural City”. CHP opposed the plan and organized a press conference to direct attention to the demolition threat. CHP's efforts resulted in cancellation of the project in late 2010.

=== North Xisi ===
Xisibei is a historic hutong area in Beijing dating back to the Qing dynasty, and is one of the historic conservation districts of the city. Despite the laws protecting it, Xisibei faced demolition. After CHP led discussion on Xisibei and generated media exposure and public opposition to the development plan, the Xisibei development project was canceled by government decision.

== Ethnic minority cultural revitalization ==
China is home to 55 ethnic minorities, totaling close to 100 million people. CHP works to restore pride of Chinese ethnic minorities in their ancestral traditions, and to assist them in incorporating cultural heritage revitalization in poverty alleviation and modernization programs.

=== Mengma Archive (2005-2008/Yunnan Province) ===
CHP assisted a group of elders of the Dai minority of Meng Ma Village in Yunnan Province to document their culture. CHP published the results as Mengma Archive, a bilingual Dai-Chinese book with English introduction and abstract.

=== Congjiang Archive (2009-2011/Guizhou Province) ===
Local people of four ethnic groups in a remote district, recorded their own cultural heritage, while producing an inventory of the heritage that needs to be conserved and revitalized in future years.

=== Qiang Cultural Documentation (2009-2011/Sichuan Province) ===
Residing in A’er Village, at the epicenter of the 2008 Sichuan earthquake, the Qiang minority's spirit and culture were severely impacted by the natural disaster. CHP has sent volunteers to revive the fading culture of the Qiang community, whose way of life and extraordinary village architecture date back to the Han dynasty.

=== Menglian Weaving Revival (2010-2011/Yunnan Province) ===
CHP is coordinating with U.S. and Thai handicraft experts to organize the women of Meng Lian County into a weaving cooperative, producing woven goods using indigenous techniques and motifs, but adapted to meet the demands of the international market.

== See also ==
- Siheyuan
- UNESCO
