= Chang Shuhong =

Chinese painter of Manchu decent

- 常书鸿
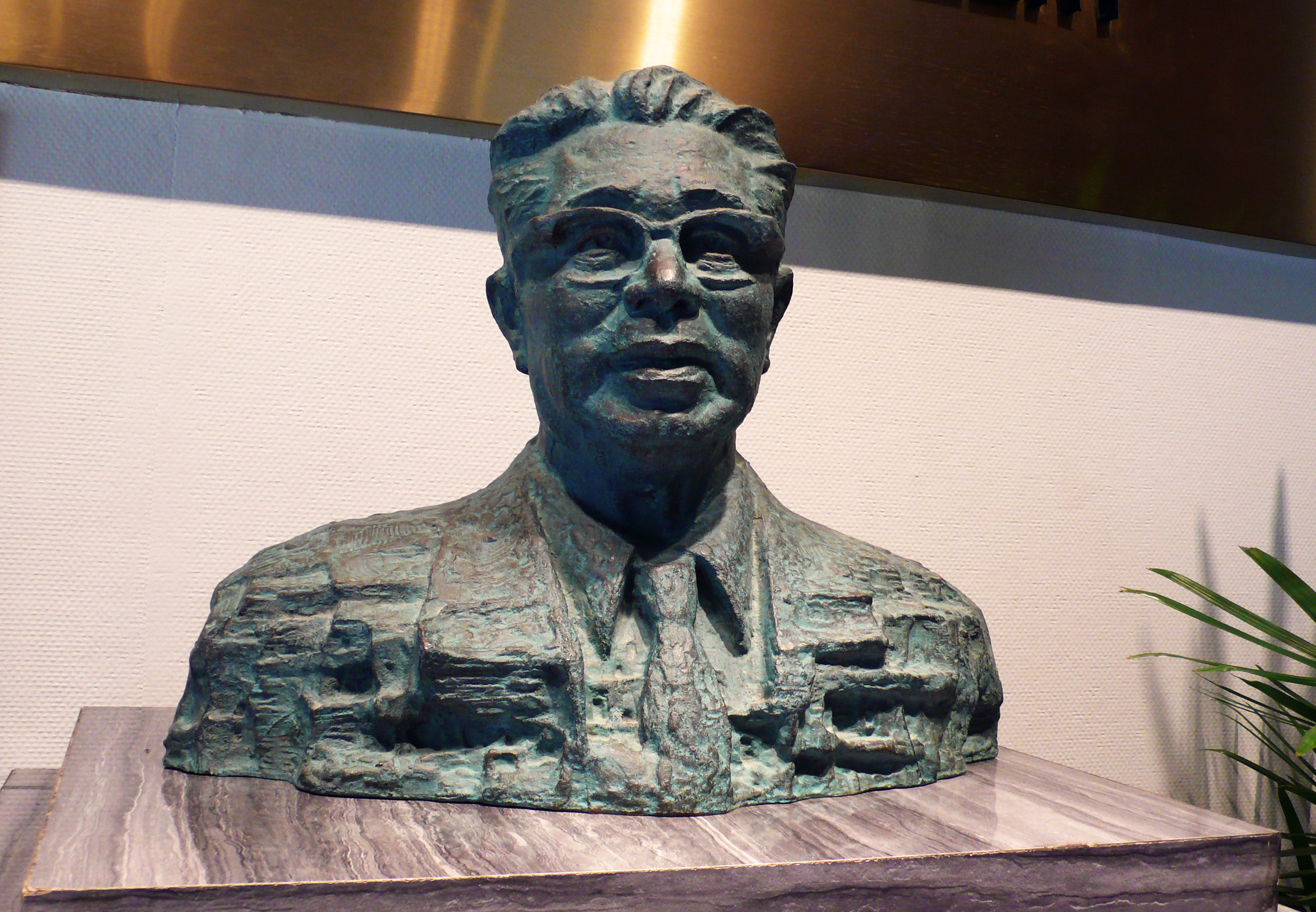
- Born: April 6, 1904; Hangzhou, Zhejiang, Qing China
- Died: June 23, 1994 (aged 90); Beijing, China
- Education: Zhejiang University
- Occupation: Painter
- Years active: 1936–1994
- Spouses: Chen Zhixiu; Li Chengxian
- Children: 2, including Chang Shana

Chinese name
- Traditional Chinese: 常書鴻
- Simplified Chinese: 常书鸿
Transcriptions
Standard Mandarin
- Hanyu Pinyin: Cháng Shūhóng

Chang Shuhong (Chinese: 常书鸿; 6 April 1904 – 23 June 1994) was a Chinese painter known as the "guardian of Dunhuang" for his crucial role in documenting, preserving, and publicizing the ancient artworks at the Mogao Grottoes in Dunhuang, China.

== Early life and education ==
Chang was born into a Manchu Bannermen family of the Irgen Gioro clan in Hangzhou, Zhejiang. His family was accorded a minor noble title of a tuwašara hafan in the Qing Dynasty.

Chang graduated from the Industrial School of Zhejiang (now Zhejiang University) in 1923. Two years later, in 1925, he became an instructor in the fine arts at his alma mater.

Pursuing further education in the arts, Chang left China for Lyon, France, in June 1927. He initially enrolled in l'institut Franco-chinois de Lyon, where he met his wife, fellow art student Chen Zhixiu. Their daughter, Chang Shana, was born in Lyon in 1931.

In 1928, Chang moved to Paris to attend the prestigious École nationale supérieure des Beaux-Arts (ENSBA, the National School of Fine Arts). Chen Zhixiu was also admitted to the ENSBA, studying sculpture.

== Return to China and journey to Dunhuang ==
While a student at the ENSBA in Paris, Chang supposedly stopped at a second-hand book stall where he was invited to peruse a copy of Paul Pelliot's "Dunhuang Caves Catalogue" (敦煌石窟图录) documenting the ancient Mogao Caves in Dunhuang, China. The next day, he discovered a large collection of Asian artwork being exhibited at the Guimet Museum which had been plundered by Western explorers from various sites in Dunhuang.

These discoveries instigated Chang's lifelong interest in the Mogao Caves and would precipitate his decision to return to China despite the protestations of Chen Zhixiu, who hoped her husband would pursue his highly promising career as an artist in France.

In 1936, after returning to China, Chang began teaching at the National Art Institute in Beijing. In 1943, he moved his family to remote Dunhuang to pursue his dream of exploring the Mogao Caves. He began over 40 years of rural life, tending to the Mogao Caves and creating his own artwork while at Dunhuang.

== Dunhuang Research Academy ==
By 1945 Chen Zhixiu felt that their rural lifestyle was unbearable, separating from Chang and leaving Dunhuang. Their daughter Chang Shana remained with her father, growing up among the Mogao Caves. She would eventually follow his path to become a renowned artist and Dunhuang scholar.

Chang Shuhong's artworks and steadfast determination to the caves garnered public attention in China, and he became renowned as the “Guardian of Dunhuang”.
