= Zhang Wenbin (archaeologist) =

Chinese archaeologist (1937–2019)

Zhang Wenbin (Chinese: 张文彬; July 1937 – 20 February 2019) was a Chinese archaeologist, museum curator and politician. He served as Director of the National Cultural Heritage Administration and Chairman of the Chinese Museums Association.

== Biography ==
Zhang was born in July 1937 in Hunyuan County, Shanxi, Republic of China. From 1958, he studied in the Department of History of Peking University, majoring in archaeology.

In 1963, Zhang was assigned to work at Luoyang Museum, and spent much of his career in the fields of archaeology and social sciences in Henan province. In 1974, he became a faculty member in the Department of History of Zhengzhou University, and later served as vice chair of the department. He was appointed Vice Director of the Henan Academy of Social Sciences in 1983, and Secretary of the Henan Provincial Communist Party Committee in 1990. In January 1996, he was named Vice Chairman of the Henan People's Congress.

In May 1996, Zhang was transferred to Beijing to serve as Director of the National Cultural Heritage Administration. In 1995, the British police intercepted a batch of archaeological artefacts imported by an antique dealer, including more than 3,400 pieces suspected of having been looted from China. Zhang was tasked by the Chinese government with retrieving the artefacts. He retained legal scholars and attorneys in Britain, and after several years of legal proceedings and negotiations, successfully repatriated the artefacts to China in 1998.

From 2002 to 2008, Zhang served as Chairman of the Chinese Museums Association. In 2013, the International Council of Museums (ICOM) awarded Zhang an Honorary Membership, its highest honour.

Zhang suffered from an illness in 2010 and lost the ability to speak, although he retained the ability to communicate by writing. He died on 20 February 2019 at Peking Union Medical College Hospital, at the age of 81.
