= National Cultural Heritage Administration =

Chinese government agency

- 国家文物局; Guójiā Wénwù Jú
- Logo of the NCHA

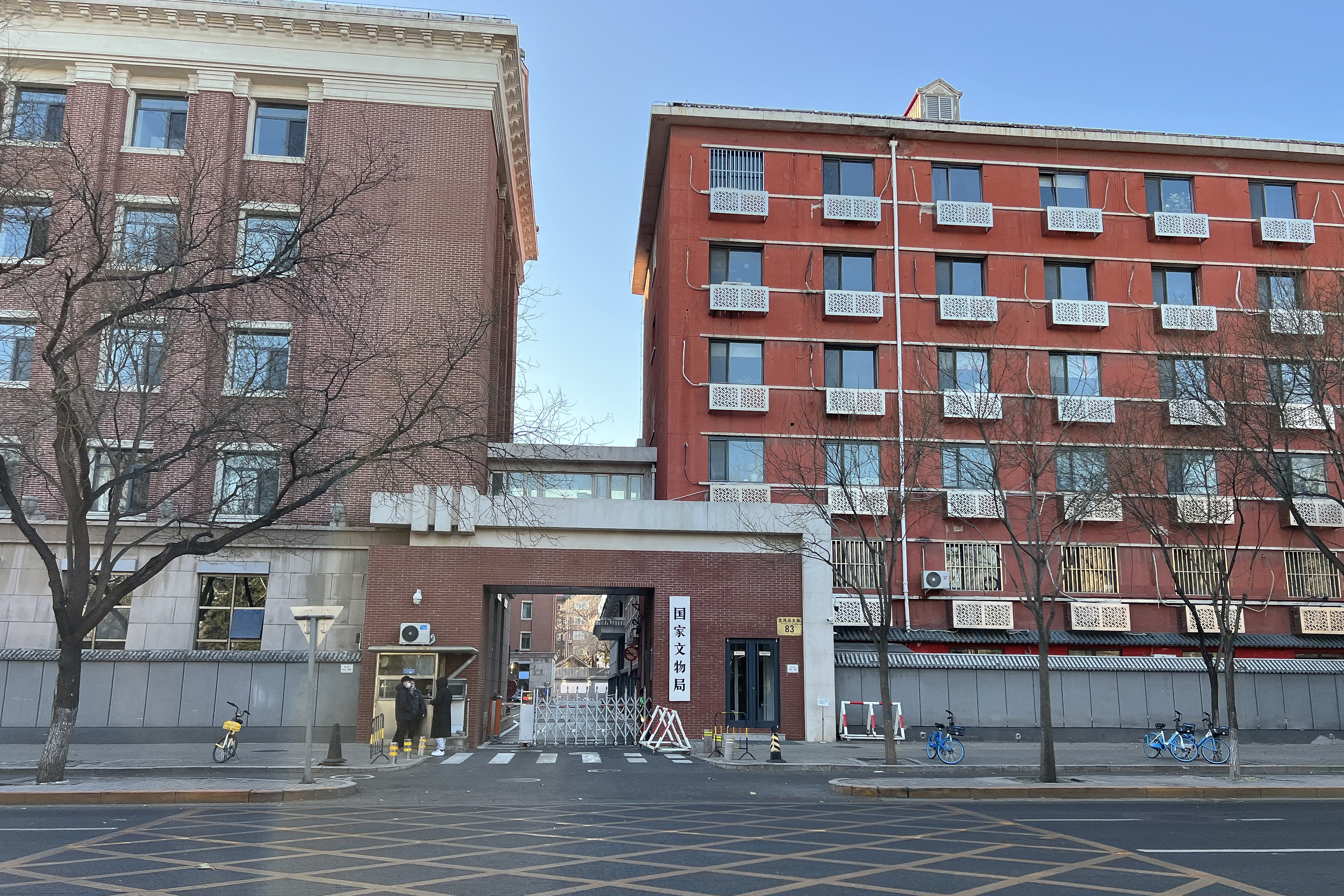
- Head Office

Agency overview
- Formed: 2003
- Superseding agency: State Bureau of Cultural Relics
- Jurisdiction: China
- Headquarters: Beijing
- Agency executive: Rao Quan, Director
- Parent agency: Ministry of Culture and Tourism
- Website: www.ncha.gov.cn

Chinese name
- Traditional Chinese: 國家文物局
- Simplified Chinese: 国家文物局
Transcriptions
Standard Mandarin
- Hanyu Pinyin: Guójiā Wénwù Jú

The National Cultural Heritage Administration (NCHA; 国家文物局) is a national bureau managed by the Ministry of Culture and Tourism of China. It is responsible for the national protection of cultural relics and the regulation of museums.

== History ==
After the Chinese Civil War, the State Bureau of Cultural Relics was established to protect relics and archaeological sites as well as help develop museums (though the agency languished during the political turmoil of the Cultural Revolution). Its cause was revitalized with the establishment of the State Cultural Relics Enterprises Management Bureau in 1973 to oversee the protection of cultural heritage and the State Bureau of Cultural Relics (SBCR) in 1988, under the jurisdiction of the Ministry of Culture, as the encompassing agency for conservation of Chinese culture and heritage.

The agency is responsible for over 500,000 registered sites of immovable cultural relics on mainland China. This includes 2,352 sites under national protection, 9,396 sites under the protection of provincial governments, and 58,300 sites under the protection of county or municipal authorities. In addition, 103 cities are designated as a "Historically and Culturally Famous City."

There are approximately one million ancient Chinese relics on display in more than 200 overseas museums. The agency is pursuing the repatriation of these items via political, diplomatic, and international conventions. The Chinese government asserts that not only were these items taken immorally but illegally as well. A UNESCO document in 1995 states that cultural relics taken during wartime should be returned to their original countries. Egypt has supported China's efforts to repatriate its historical artifacts since they share a similar history.

== Pursuits ==
In 2001, the National Gallery of Canada returned an arhat sculpture that was dated about 1300 years ago. This was the first time a museum voluntarily returned an item to the state agency.

A guardian statue that had been looted from a Chinese tomb in 1994 was seized by U.S. customs agents. The U.S. Attorney for the Southern District of New York (Mary Jo White) filed a civil forfeiture suit under the Convention on Cultural Property Implementation Act, which led to the statue's seizure. It was returned in May 2001.

In 2001, the Miho Museum in Kyoto, Japan, returned a rare Buddhist statue that was stolen from a public garden in the Shandong province.

A rare bronze horse was purchased for 8.9 million US by Macau billionaire Stanley Ho who donated it to China.

In 2009, an auction in France took place despite protests from the Chinese Government. Two bronze sculptures that were looted from the Old Summer Palace during the Second Opium War were being auctioned. The purchaser, François Pinault, bought them and donated them back to China in 2013.

An imperial Chinese gilt metal box appeared at an auction in Salisbury in 2011. It was sold for £400,000. In that same year, another relic (a yellow jade pendant carved as a dragon) sold for £478,000 at another auction in Dorchester.

In April 2018, the Tiger Ying (a bronze water vessel) sold at an auction in the United Kingdom. The National Cultural Heritage Administration condemned the auction arguing it was illegally looted from China and demanded its return. The auctioneers did not comment on Chinese requests and the auction went ahead. However, after some private negotiations, the Tiger Ying was returned and became part of the National Museum of China's collection in November of that year.

The FBI Art Crime Team returned 361 cultural artifacts to China on February 28, 2019.

A court in Milan Italy ruled 796 artifacts to be returned to China. They arrived in Beijing on April 10, 2019. Some of these relics include porcelain items from the Song and Ming dynasties.

== List of directors ==
English title	Chinese title	Term start	Term end	Notes
Zheng Zhenduo	郑振铎	December 1949	October 1958	
Wang Yeqiu	王冶秋	October 1958	May 1970	
Wang Yeqiu	王冶秋	October 1973	November 1979	
Ren Zibin	任资斌	January 1980	May 1982	
Sun Yiqing	孙轶清	May 1982	March 1984	
Lü Jimin	吕济民	March 1984	April 1988	
Zhang Deqin	张德勤	April 1988	September 1996	
Zhang Wenbin	张文彬	September 1996	August 2002	
Shan Jixiang	单霁翔	August 2002	February 2012	
Li Xiaojie	励小捷	February 2012	October 2015	
Liu Yuzhu	刘玉珠	October 2015	March 2021	
Li Qun	李群	March 2021	Incumbent	

== See also ==
- 2009 Auction of Old Summer Palace bronze heads
- Repatriation (cultural heritage)#International conventions
