= Dunhuang Research Academy =

Research institute in Dunhuang, Gansu, China

- 敦煌研究院
- Abbreviation: DHRA
- Predecessor: National Research Institute on Dunhuang Art
- Formation: 1944
- Founder: Chang Shuhong
- Type: Government-sponsored research institute
- Location: Dunhuang, Gansu, China
- Fields: Chinese culture and history
- Official language: Chinese
- Director: Zhao Shengliang
- Website: en.dha.ac.cn
- Formerly called: Dunhuang Institute of Cultural Relics

The Dunhuang Research Academy (Chinese: 敦煌研究院; pinyin: Dūnhuáng Yánjiùyuàn), originally the National Research Institute on Dunhuang Art, is a "national comprehensive institution" responsible for overseeing the Mogao Caves, a UNESCO World Heritage Site located near Dunhuang in Gansu, China. Established in 1944 by the Nationalist government, it continues to oversee day-to-day management of the site as well as preservation and research projects.

The institute conducts guided tours of selected caves throughout the year, and collaborates with other organizations to increase digital access to artifacts, most notably through the International Dunhuang Project.

== History ==
At the start of the twentieth century, the Taoist priest Wang Yuanlu appointed himself caretaker of the Mogao Caves, which by this time were ancient temples. His accidental discovery of the hidden Library Cave, which contained the Dunhuang manuscripts, attracted the attention of many Western archaeologists and explorers. In 1907 and 1908, British and French expeditions led by Aurel Stein and Paul Pelliot, respectively, persuaded Wang to allow them to purchase and remove tens of thousands of items which were shipped to Europe and India. For the next forty years, the site suffered extensive damage due to further removal of items, as well as Russian (1921) and Kuomintang (1939) military activities.

In 1941, Sichuanese painter Chang Dai-chien arrived at the site and began work repairing and copying the murals. He exhibited and published his copies in 1943, which elevated the Mogao artworks to national prominence. Subsequently, historian Xiang Da persuaded Yu Youren, a prominent Kuomintang member and Nationalist government official, to propose the establishment of the Dunhuang Research Academy to prevent further destruction to the artifacts and artwork within the Mogao Caves.

In 1950 the institute was renamed the Research Institute on Cultural Relics of Dunhuang. It was subsequently given its current name in 1984.

In 1979 the Mogao Caves were opened to the public, and received 27,000 visitors that year. By 2014, the Dunhuang Research Academy was handling up to 1 million visitors yearly. "Tourist hordes" are reported to be a potential threat to conservation efforts.

Since the late 1980s, the Dunhuang Research Academy has engaged in a long-term partnership with the Getty Conservation Institute in Los Angeles. The partnership has focused on conservation and monitoring practices, including the development of the China Principles, a set of national conservation and management guidelines.

== Current activities ==
As of June 2015, there was a plan to transform the Mogao Caves into a tourist attraction and theme park. The plan, which was drafted by commercial tourism development company Boya Strategy Consultation Group at the request of Gansu provincial officials, has been criticized and opposed by Fan Jinshi, longtime director of the Dunhuang Research Academy, and He Shuzhong of the Beijing Cultural Heritage Protection Center.

On September 13, 2016, the Dunhuang Research Academy signed a memorandum of understanding with the Institute of High Energy Physics of the Chinese Academy of Sciences to "work together for the protection of the Cultural Relics of Dunhuang". The partnership is focused on the development of technology for restoration and digitization of artifacts, as well as the creation of multi-media virtual tour presentations to "allow visitors to see more of the Dunhuang art in higher detail, and help conserve the treasures inside the caves."

== List of directors ==
No.	English name	Chinese name	Term of office	Notes
1	Chang Shuhong	常书鸿	1951–1984	
2	Duan Wenjie	段文杰	1984–1998	
3	Fan Jinshi	樊锦诗	April 1998–December 2014	
4	Wang Xudong	王旭东	December 2014–April 2019	
5	Zhao Shengliang	赵声良	April 2019–Present	
