= Cultural Palace of Nationalities =

Museum and library complex in Beijing

Coordinates: 39°54′34″N 116°22′09″E

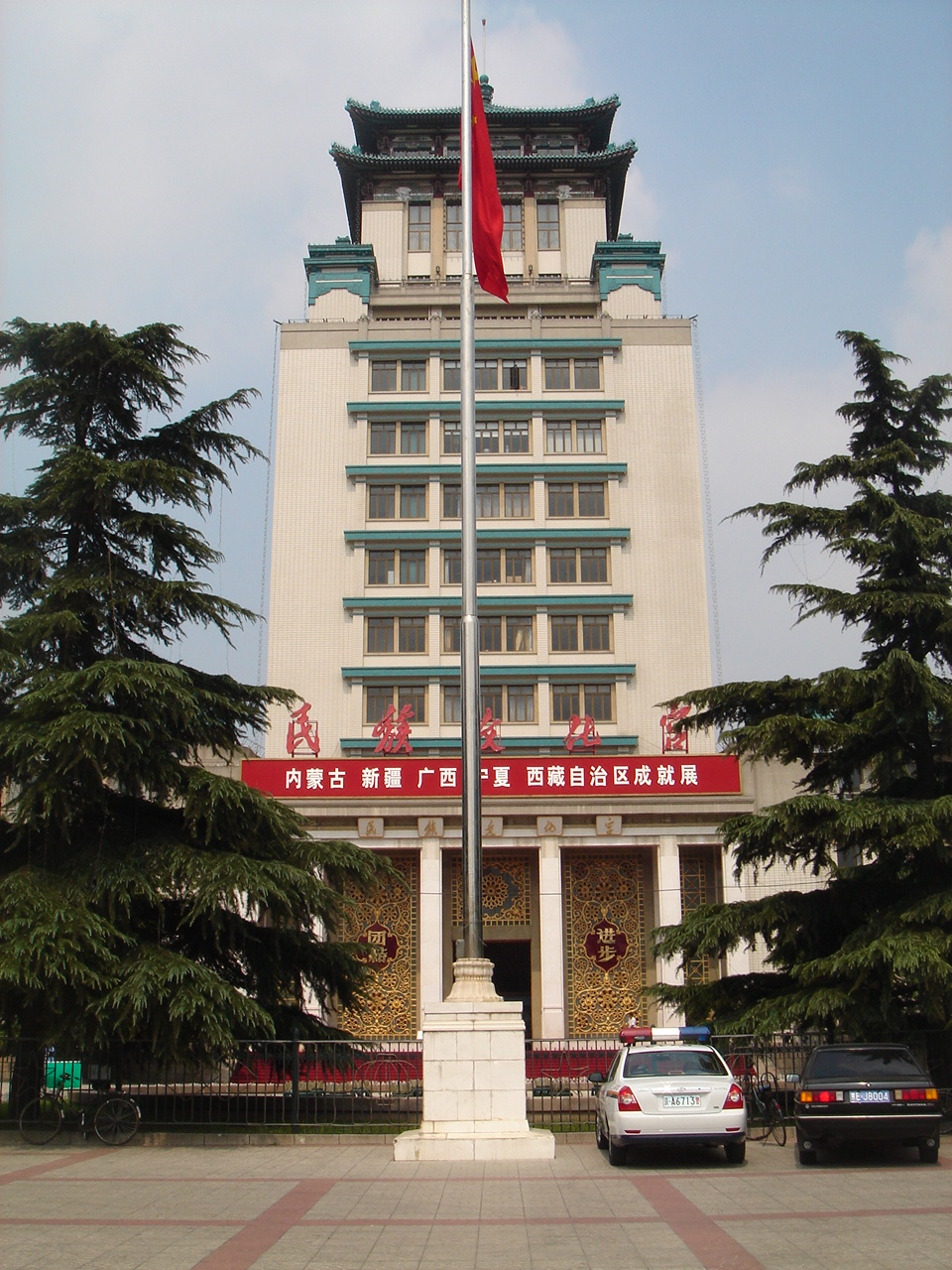
The Cultural Palace of Nationalities

The Cultural Palace of Nationalities (Chinese: 民族文化宫) is located in Beijing's Xicheng District, on West Chang'an Avenue. Built in September 1959, it is one of the Ten Great Buildings and was registered as the first of 55 museums in the city. The building houses a museum, an art gallery, a library, an art institute, a theater, a guesthouse, and other facilities. It is under the administration of the State Ethnic Affairs Commission of the United Front Work Department.

== Architecture ==
The Cultural Palace of Nationalities was built by the master of contemporary Chinese architecture Zhang Bo (1911–1999), whose well-known works include the Great Hall, Beijing Hotel，Friendship Hotel, and Diaoyutai State Guesthouse. It covers 32,000 m^{2}. The main building has 13 floors and is 67 meters high. The east and west sides are surrounded by wings, with a central exhibition hall extending north. The exterior is predominantly white, with peacock-blue glazed tile roof eaves. Characters over its entrance spell "unity" (tuanjie) and "progress" (jinbu).In 1994, the building was voted first among Beijing's "50 Favorite Ethnic-Style Buildings". In 1999, at the 20th Congress of the International Union of Architects, it was selected as one of the notable works of twentieth-century Chinese architecture.

== Function ==
The mission of the Culture Palace is to serve and educate the various minority cultures of the country. Its collection includes over 60 million literature and science text books, the basic display for the "Chinese Traditional Culture Series" exhibition, and theater performances. In recent years, the building also provides exhibition space to other types of exhibitions organized.The museum section of the Cultural Palace opened to the public in October 1959. It has 3,780 square metres of exhibition space and five exhibition halls. Its collection includes more than 50,000 objects relating to China's ethnic minority groups, including production tools, everyday objects, clothing, musical instruments, coins, documents, arts and crafts, and religious items. The museum also holds more than 60,000 photographs, over 2,000 books and documents, and more than 500 audiovisual items.

In 1979, the National Palace Museum changed its name to the National Palace Hall. The museum's collection contains cultural relics of ethnic minorities in China to promote minority cultures. Large collections of arts and crafts, costumes, musical instruments, and religious articles show the culture of the Chinese of all ethnic groups, and witness the historical development of all ethnic groups.
