= Wang Xudong (curator) =

Chinese researcher and museum curator

- 王旭东
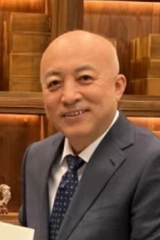

Director of the Palace Museum
- Incumbent
- Assumed office 8 April 2019
- Preceded by: Shan Jixiang

4th Director of Dunhuang Research Academy
- In office December 2014 – April 2019
- Preceded by: Fan Jinshi
- Succeeded by: Zhao Shengliang

Personal details
- Born: February 1967 (age 59) Shandan County, Gansu, China
- Party: Chinese Communist Party
- Education: Shandan No. 1 High School; Lanzhou University
- Occupation: Curator, professor

Chinese name
- Simplified Chinese: 王旭东
- Traditional Chinese: 王旭東
Transcriptions
Standard Mandarin
- Hanyu Pinyin: Wáng Xùdōng

Wang Xudong (Chinese: 王旭东; born February 1967) is a Chinese researcher and curator of the Palace Museum since 8 April 2019. Previously he served as director of Dunhuang Research Academy. He is an alternate of the 19th Central Committee of the Chinese Communist Party.

== Biography ==
Wang was born in Shandan County, Zhangye, Gansu, in 1967. After graduating from Shandan No. 1 High School in July 1986, he entered Lanzhou University, where he majored in hydrogeology and engineering geology. After university, he briefly worked in a hydropower station in his home-city Zhangye. In June 1991 he joined the Dunhuang Research Academy, and was appointed its 4th director in December 2014. On April 8, 2019, he replaced Shan Jixiang to become director of the Palace Museum.

Academic offices
Preceded by Fan Jinshi	Director of the Dunhuang Research Academy; 2014–2019	Succeeded by Zhao Shengliang
Government offices
Preceded by Shan Jixiang	Director of the Palace Museum; 2019–present	Incumbent
