= List of Chinese archaeologists =

List of Chinese archaeologists

- An Jiayao 安家瑶 (1947–)
- Cao Wei 曹玮
- Chen Mengjia 陈梦家 (1911–1966)
- Chen Tiemei 陈铁梅 (1935–2018)
- Dong Zuobin 董作賓 (1895–1963)
- Duan Qingbo 段清波 (1964–2019)
- Lixin Guo 郭立新 (1968–)
- Huang Zhanyue 黄展岳 (1926–2019)
- Huang Wenbi 黄文弼 (Huang Wen-pi) (1893–1966)
- Jao Tsung-I 饒宗頤 (1917–2018)
- Li Feng 李峰 (1962–)
- Li Ji 李濟 (Li Chi) (1896-1979)
- Li Ling 李零 (1948–)
- Li Xueqin 李学勤 (Li Hsüeh-ch'in) (1933–2019)
- Liang Siyong 梁思永 (Liang Ssu-yung) (1904–1954)
- Liu E 刘鹗 (1857–1909)
- Luo Zhenyu 羅振玉 (Lo Chen-yü) (1866–1940)
- Ma Chengyuan 马承源 (1927–2004)
- Mai Yinghao 麦英豪 (1929–2016)
- Shen Kuo (沈括) (1031–1095)
- Su Bai 宿白 (1922–2018)
- Su Bingqi 苏秉琦 (1909–1997)
- Tong Enzheng 童恩正 (1935–1997)
- Wang Tao 汪涛 (1962–)
- Wang Zhenduo 王振铎 (1911–1992)
- Wang Zhongshu 王仲殊 (1925–2015)
- Wang Ziyun 王子云 (1899–1990)
- Xia Nai 夏鼐 (1910–1985)
- Xu Xusheng 徐旭生 (1888–1976)
- Yang Hongxun 杨鸿勋 (1931–2016)
- Yu Xingwu (于省吾) (1896–1984)
- Yuan Zhongyi 袁仲一 (1932–)
- Zeng Zhaoyu 曾昭燏 (1909–1964)
- Zhang Changshou 张长寿 (1929–2020)
- Kwang-chih Chang (K.C. Chang) 張光直 (1931–2001)
- Zhang Wenbin 张文彬 (1937–2019)
- Zhang Zhenduo 鄭振鐸 (1898–1958)
- Zhao Kangmin 赵康民 (1936–2018)
