= History of Chinese archaeology =

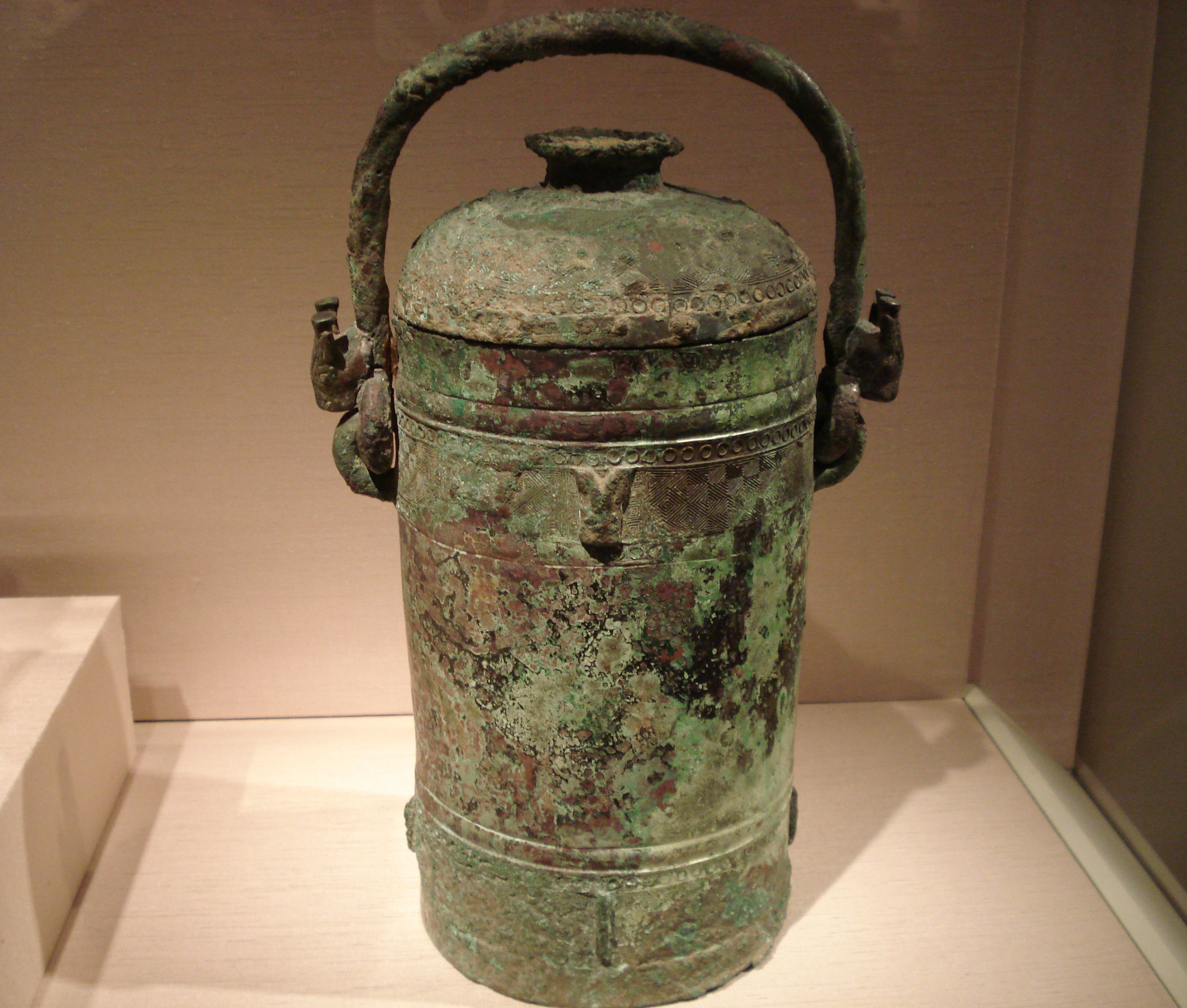
A cylindrical bronze wine container made during the late Shang dynasty (c. 1600 – c. 1050 BCE); such items were excavated by gentry scholars of the Song dynasty (960–1279).

Chinese archaeology has been practiced since the Song dynasty (960–1279) with early practices of antiquarianism. Although native Chinese antiquarianism developed some rigorous methods of unearthing, studying, and cataloging ancient artifacts, the field of archaeology in China never developed into a branch of study outside of Chinese historiography. Native Chinese antiquarian studies waned after the Song period but were revived during the Qing dynasty (1644–1912). Rigorous standards of modern Chinese archaeology were first developed at the turn of the 20th century by Chinese archaeologists educated in the West and in the early Republic of China (1912–1949).

== History ==
Archaeology in China is divided into two stages, namely traditional epigraphy and modern archaeology.

=== Traditional Epigraphy ===
During the Song dynasty (960–1279), the Chinese gentry's antiquarian pursuits of art collecting, scholar-officials retrieved ancient relics from archaeological sites in order to revive the use of ancient vessels in ceremonies of state ritual. Scholar-officials claimed to have discovered ancient bronze vessels that were created as far back as the Shang dynasty (1600–1046 BCE), which bore the written characters of the Shang era. Some attempted to recreate these bronze vessels by using imagination alone, not by observing tangible evidence of relics, a practice criticized by Shen Kuo in his Dream Pool Essays published in 1088. He also objected to the idea of his peers that ancient relics were created by famous "sages" in lore or the ancient aristocratic class, rightfully observing the discovered handicrafts and ancient vessels as the work of artisans and commoners from previous eras. Shen also disapproved of his peers' pursuit of archaeology simply to enhance state ritual, since he not only took an interdisciplinary approach with the study of archaeology, but he also emphasized the study of functionality and investigating what was the ancient relics' original processes of manufacture. Shen used ancient texts and existing models of armillary spheres to create one based on ancient standards and experimented with ancient musical measures, making the suggestion to hang an ancient bell by a hollow handle.

The scholar Ouyang Xiu (1007–1072) analyzed alleged ancient artifacts bearing archaic inscriptions in bronze and stone, which he preserved in a collection of some 400 rubbings; Patricia Ebrey writes that he pioneered early ideas in epigraphy.

The Kaogutu (考古圖) or "Illustrated Catalogue of Examined Antiquity" (preface dated 1092) compiled by Lü Dalin (呂大臨) (1046–1092) is one of the oldest known catalogues to systematically describe and classify ancient artifacts which were unearthed. Another catalogue was the Chong xiu Xuanhe bogutu (重修宣和博古圖) or "Revised Illustrated Catalogue of Xuanhe Profoundly Learned Antiquity" (compiled from 1111 to 1125), commissioned by Emperor Huizong of Song (r. 1100 – 1125), and also featured illustrations of some 840 vessels and rubbings. This catalogue was criticized by Hong Mai (1123–1202), who found that descriptions of certain ancient vessels dating to the Han dynasty were incorrect when he compared them to actual Han dynasty specimens he obtained for study.

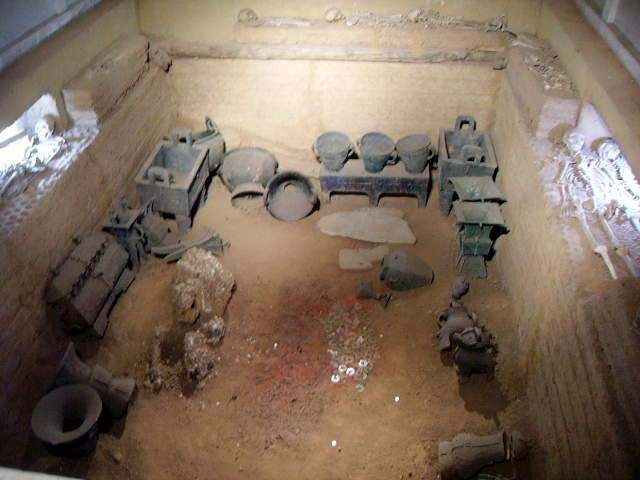
Burial pit at Tomb of Lady Fu Hao, as it is now displayed

Song scholars established a formal system of dating these artifacts by examining their inscriptions, decorative motif styles, and physical shapes. Zhao Mingcheng (1081–1129) stressed the importance of utilizing ancient inscriptions to correct discrepancies and errors in later texts discussing ancient events, such as with dates, geographical locations of historical events, genealogies, and official titles.

Bruce G. Trigger writes that interests in antiquarian studies of ancient inscriptions and artifacts waned after the Song dynasty, but were revived by early Qing dynasty (1644–1912) scholars such as Gu Yanwu (1613–1682) and Yan Ruoju (1636–1704). Craig Clunas also states that epigraphic studies weren't revived until the Qing dynasty, but that printed copies of the Chong xiu Xuanhe bogutu were widely circulated in the 16th century during the Ming dynasty (1368–1644). Trigger asserts that archaeology as a discipline of its own never developed in China until adoption of Western methods in modern times, and was always considered a branch of historiography instead.

=== Modern Archaeology ===
Modern archaeology is the transformation and evolution of ancient Chinese archaeology, that is, traditional epigraphy to modern archaeology, and its characteristics are the collision and convergence of Eastern and Western academics.

At the beginning of the 20th century, the "Yigupai" emerged, and the historians were divided in the study of ancient Chinese history. Fu Sinian advocated using archaeology to solve this problem, and wanted to verify historical materials through underground cultural relics. He made great contributions to the excavation of Yin Ruins. Under the protection of Fu Sinian, the archaeological team of the Shiyu Institute conducted a total of 13 Yin Ruins excavation work.

The continuous archaeology of the Yin Ruins cultivated the first generation of archaeologists in China who upheld modern scientific standards. The advancement of archaeology in mainstream Chinese science was developed by a group of leading archaeologists represented by Li Ji (1896–1979), Liang Siyong (1904–1954), and Xia Nai (1910–1985), who received strict anthropological and archaeological training in the West. The establishment of the archaeological group of the Institute of History and Linguistics of the Academia Sinica became a national-level institution specializing in archaeology at that time.

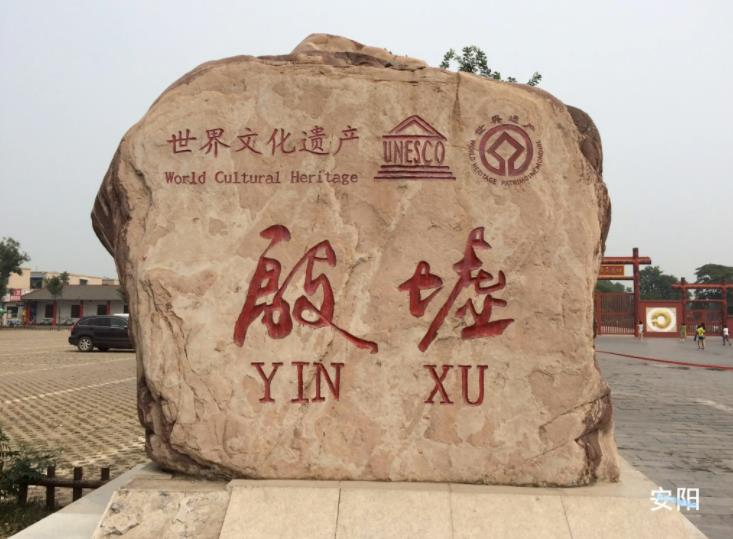
The entrance sign at the Yinxu ruins

The establishment of the Geological Survey Institute in 1916 was a sign of the scientific research carried out by Chinese academic institutions in modern times. Under the leadership of the founder, Director Ding Wenjiang, geology has made great achievements in China, hired many foreign experts, trained a group of professional local field workers, disseminated a large amount of Western scientific knowledge, and made science fall in the practice, creating a new paradigm for scientific research in China.

In 1921, the Swedish scholar Johan Gunnar Andersson discovered the Yangshao culture and proposed a "Western Origin" for Chinese culture. Although later this view was largely abandoned in academia, Andersson represented the spread of modern archaeology based on fieldwork and excavation materials to China.

In 1926, Li Ji excavated at the site of Xiyin Village, Xia County, Shanxi Province, which was the first field excavation conducted by Chinese scholars. In 1928, the archaeological group of the Shiyu Institute excavated the ruins of Yinxu.

Wang Guowei once proposed a "dual evidence method" that combines written documents and underground relics to study history. The "dual evidence method" not only promotes the new development of historical research, but also lays a foundation for archaeological research theoretically and methodically.

In the spring and autumn of 1931, Liang Siyong presided over the excavation of the Hougang site in Anyang, Henan province, where he found the specific layer relationship between the Xiaotun culture, Longshan culture and Yangshao culture. Longshan culture was earlier than Xiaotun culture and later than Yangshao culture.

== See also ==
- Chinese ritual bronzes
- History of archaeology
- Science and technology of the Song dynasty
