= Li Yufang =

Chinese archaeologist

- 李毓芳
- Born: April 1943
- Died: March 2023 (aged 79)
- Education: Peking University
- Spouse: Liu Qingzhu
- Children: 1
- Scientific career
- Fields: Archaeology

In this Chinese name, the family name is Li.

Li Yufang (Chinese: 李毓芳; April 1943 – March 2023) was a distinguished Chinese archaeologist known for her extensive contributions to field archaeology, particularly in the excavation and research of key sites from the Qin and Han dynasties. Over her career, Li dedicated herself to the study of capitals, imperial tombs, and other central relics associated with these dynasties. Li played a leading role in numerous significant excavations across China. She is especially remembered for her work on the archaeological sites of Han Chang’an and the E’pang Palace, and for advancing research on bone slips from the Han dynasty.

Since her first formal involvement in field excavation in 1972, Li remained dedicated to frontline archaeological work throughout her career. She was described as the ‘Daughter of the Earth’ in recognition of her unwavering commitment. She died in Zhengzhou on March 27, 2023, at the age of 80.

== Biography ==
=== Early life and education ===
In 1943, Li Yufang was born in Beijing.

In 1962, she took the national college entrance examination and was accepted into the Department of History at Peking University, where she chose to specialize in archaeology.

During her studies, she attended a speech at the Great Hall of the People by Premier Zhou Enlai, who encouraged students to cherish their educational opportunities and to serve the people upon graduation. Inspired by this speech, Li resolved to excel in archaeology, regardless of the field’s challenges, believing, “What men can do, I can do—and better”.

In 1964, she participated in her first fieldwork training as part of her university program.

In 1967, Li graduated from university. However, she faced delays in beginning her professional career due to the Cultural Revolution. Instead, she was assigned to work on a military-run farm in Shaanxi Province, where she spent two years engaged in labor.

In 1969, after leaving the farm, she was assigned to teach at a secondary school in Xunyi County.

=== Career ===
In 1971, Li joined the Xianyang Museum in Shaanxi, marking the beginning of her professional archaeological career.

In 1979, she transferred to the Institute of Archaeology, Chinese Academy of Social Sciences, where she would spend most of her career.

==== Professional roles ====
Li held several prominent positions in the field of Chinese archaeology. She served as the head of the Han Chang’an City Archaeological Team and the E’pang Palace Archaeological Team at the Institute of Archaeology, Chinese Academy of Social Sciences (CASS). Additionally, she was an invited researcher at the Xi’an Archaeological Research Institute.

Li was also actively involved in advocating for women in archaeology, serving as a member and later the head of the Women’s Working Committee at CASS and the Women’s Working Committee at the Institute of Archaeology, CASS.

=== Archaeological excavation and research ===
==== Before 2002 ====
Li participated in a number of significant archaeological excavations of ancient cities, architectural sites, and tombs, including the No. 3 Building at the Qin Xianyang Palace, the Yangjiawan 杨家湾 Han Tomb, the Maquan 马泉 Han Tomb, the Tang Dynasty Qinglong 青龙 Temple site, the Qin and Han Liyang 栎阳 City site, the Du 杜 Tomb of Emperor Xuan of Han, and the Han Chang’an 长安 City site.

- Yang Jiawan Han Tomb

Li contributed to the excavation of the Yangjiawan Han tomb, an important burial site associated with the tomb of Emperor Gaozu of Han.

This was Li’s first excavation after formally joining the field of archaeology. Here, she gained valuable experience under the guidance of the site director, Shi Xingbang (Chinese: 石兴邦). Following Shi’s rigorous standards, Li carefully cleared every archaeological feature uncovered, approaching each task with diligence and responsibility. This foundational experience laid the groundwork for her future career.

- the Du 杜 Tomb of Emperor Xuan of Han

She contributed to the excavation of the Du tomb of Emperor Xuan of Han, providing key insights into Han imperial burial practices.

- Han Chang’an 长安 City Site

Li served as the head of several major excavations, including sites at the Han capital, Chang’an, where she led work on Weiyang Palace, the Eastern and Western Markets, and Jianzhang Palace.

Her excavation of the ceramic figurine kilns at the Han Chang’an City site in 1991 was selected as one of China’s top ten archaeological discoveries of the year.

- Research on Han Dynasty bone slips

In 1987, Li discovered numerous bone slips inscribed with characters at the Weiyang 未央 Palace site. She and her husband, Liu Qingzhu (Chinese: 刘庆柱), identified these as records related to weapons supplies to the Han imperial court, providing invaluable historical material on the administrative system of the Han dynasty. This discovery laid the groundwork for her later research project on Han dynasty bone slips, which she continued post-retirement.

In June 2018, Zhonghua Book Company officially published the 90-volume work Bone Slips from the Weiyang Palace of Han Chang’an City. This monumental collection, comprising 15 million characters, represents an unprecedented achievement in the study of excavated documents in Chinese archaeology. It holds profound significance across numerous fields, including Chinese chronology, philology, archival studies, military studies (particularly the history of weaponry), history of handicrafts, calligraphy, and the study of official positions.

==== 2002 to 2008 ====
Li led excavations at the E’pang Palace site and the Shanglin 上林 Park site from the Qin and Han periods.

- E’pang 阿房 Palace Site

Through rigorous and systematic work, Li and the team achieved the scientific understanding that E’pang Palace was ‘never completed’ and ‘not burned’.

This conclusion sparked considerable controversy and attention at the time. However, Li upheld a spirit of scientific rigor, maintaining her position through careful analysis of the excavation findings. Ultimately, her perspective gained acceptance, correcting a longstanding misunderstanding that had persisted for over a thousand years.

Li regards the Epang Palace excavation as the most proud and important accomplishment of her archaeological career.

==== 2011-2023 ====
Since 2011, Li has also contributed to excavations at key sites such as the Wotouzhai 窝头寨 Han Dynasty minting site, the Qin and Han Liyang City site, the Zhongwei 中渭 Bridge site in Xi’an, the Han-Tang canals, Kunming 昆明 Pond from the Han-Tang periods, the Zhengguo 郑国 Canal of the Qin and Han, the Bai 白 Canal of the Han-Tang periods, and the Dongmafang 东马坊 site.

- The Zhongwei Bridge and Qin-Han Liyang City sites were listed among China’s Top Ten Archaeological Discoveries of the Year in 2013 and 2017, respectively.
- In 2019, the State Council of China designated the Zhongwei Bridge and Dongmafang sites as National Key Cultural Relics Protection Units.

== Personal life ==
Li married her university classmate Liu Qingzhu (Chinese: 刘庆柱).

After graduating from university, Li and Liu were both assigned to work in the farm and later taught together in Xunyi County, where they married. Once they formally began their careers in archaeology, both were employed at the Institute of Archaeology, Chinese Academy of Social Sciences.

Li and Liu have often collaborated on academic research, supporting and encouraging each other’s professional growth. Both are distinguished archaeologists, recognized for their contributions to the field. The two worked together on multiple archaeological projects and co-authored research, including the book Han Chang'an Weiyang Palace, which won the first prize of the Chinese Academy of Social Sciences Outstanding Achievement Award in 2000.

They had a daughter.

== Works ==
Over her career, Li has made significant contributions to the study of ancient Chinese capitals and imperial mausoleums, authoring over 40 research papers, excavation reports, and mid-length studies, along with four monographs as sole author or co-author.

Her book, A Study of the Mausoleums of the Western Han Emperors, received the Outstanding Research Achievement Award from the Institute of Archaeology, Chinese Academy of Social Sciences, in 1993. Her works, The Site of the Du Mausoleum of the Han and Weiyang Palace of Han Chang’an, are considered leading studies in both domestic and international academic circles.

- 西汉十一陵[The Eleven Mausoleums of the Western Han](in Chinese), Xian: Shaanxi renmin chubanshe 陕西人民出版社, 1987.
- 陵寝史话[Historical Narratives of Imperial Tombs](in Chinese), Beijing: Shehui kexue wenxian chubanshe 社会科学文献出版社, 2011.
- 汉长安城[Han Chang’an City](in Chinese), Beijing: Wenwu chubanshe 文物出版社, 2003.
- 中国古代都城考古发现与研究[Archaeological Discoveries and Research on Ancient Chinese Capitals](in Chinese), Beijing: Shehui kexue wenxian chubanshe 社会科学文献出版社, 2006.
- 汉杜陵陵园遗址[The Site of the Du Mausoleum of the Han](in Chinese), Beijing: Kexue chubanshe 科学出版社, 1993.
- 汉长安城未央宫骨签[Bone Inscriptions from the Weiyang Palace of Han Chang’an City](in Chinese), Beijing: Zhonghua shuju 中华书局, 2020.

Li’s work has also been featured in Acta Archaeologica Sinica and other journals, with reports and papers on the Han Chang’an City site, the front hall of the Epang Palace of Qin, the Shanglin Park site of Qin and Han, the Liyang City site of Qin and Han, and Qin-era clay seals.

== Honors ==
- In recognition of her significant contributions, Li was awarded a special government allowance by the State Council of China, acknowledging her exceptional service and impact in the field.
- Li has been honored with the title of ‘Outstanding Woman Worker’ by both the Chinese Academy of Social Sciences (CASS) and the Central Commission for the Work Committee of the Central Government Organs.
- Li was also recognized as a Model Worker by the State Council of China.
- In 2001, on the 80th anniversary of the founding of the Chinese Communist Party, Li was selected as one of the ‘Top Ten Outstanding Party Members’ at CASS.
- Her achievements have been documented in The Spirit of Women: Volume II. Additionally, her exemplary contributions were featured in the promotional film The Spirit of Women, produced by the Publicity Department of the Chinese Communist Party, the Office of the Central Commission for Spiritual Civilization Development, and the All-China Women’s Federation.
