= Su Bingqi =

Chinese archaeologist

- 苏秉琦
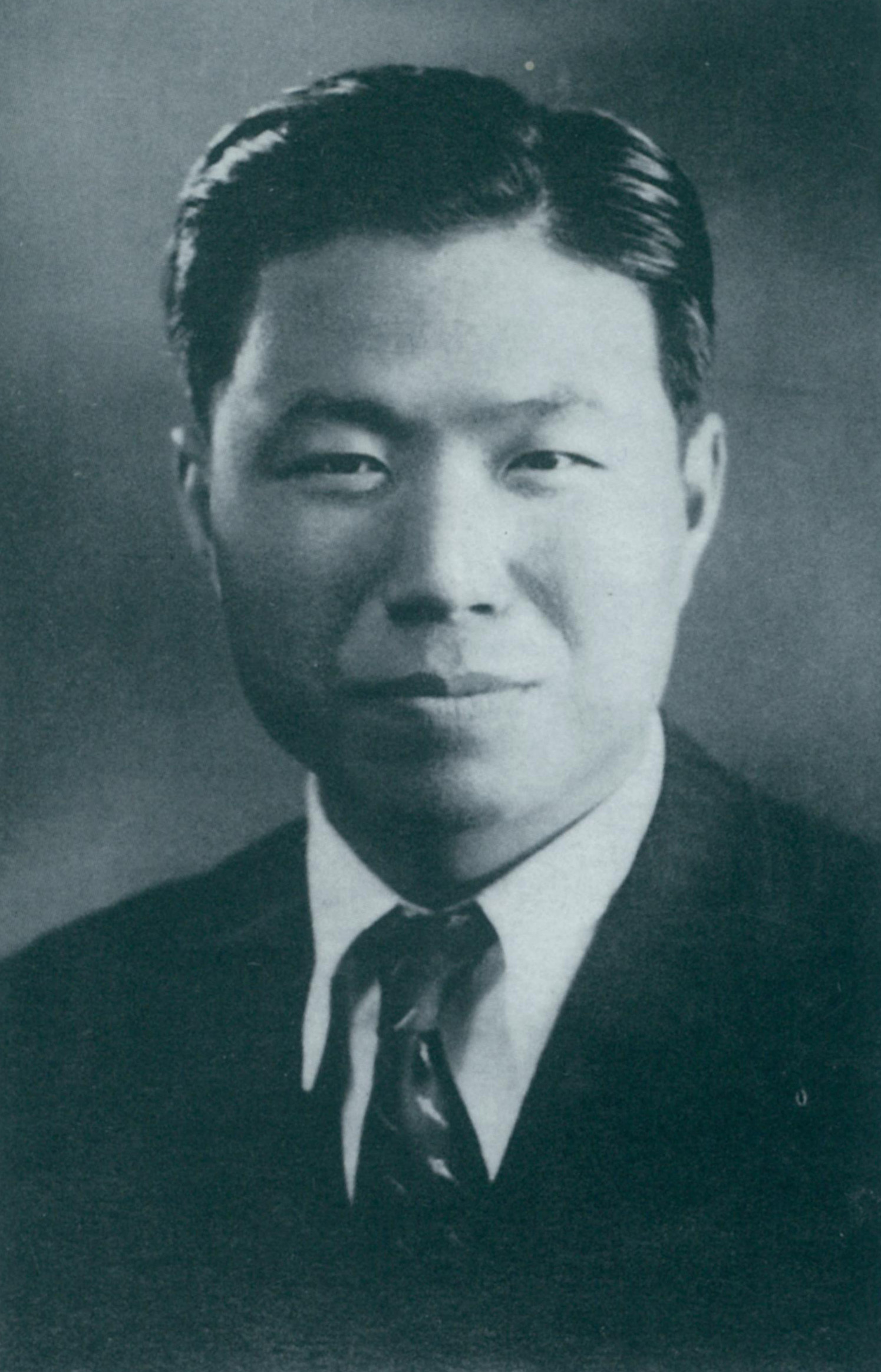
- Su Bingqi in 1945
- Born: 1909; Gaoyang County, Zhili, Qing dynasty
- Died: 30 June 1997 (aged 87–88)
- Education: Beijing Normal University
- Known for: "Regional systems and cultural types" model of prehistoric China
- Children: Su Kaizhi
- Scientific career
- Fields: Archaeology of ancient China
- Workplaces: Peking University

Su Bingqi (Chinese: 苏秉琦; Wade–Giles: Su Ping-ch'i; 1909 – 30 June 1997) was a Chinese archaeologist and co-founder of Peking University's archaeology program. He was China's major archaeological theoretician for 50 years, and regarded in his later years as the paramount authority on the archaeology of China. He was best known for his "regional systems and cultural types" (区系类型) model of Chinese Neolithic cultural development, which rejected the traditional view of Chinese culture radiating from the core Central Plain region. The model has since been widely adopted. It was further developed by Kwang-chih Chang as the Chinese Interaction Sphere model.

== Biography ==
Su was born in 1909 in Gaoyang County, Hebei Province. From 1928 to 1934 he studied history at Beijing Normal University. After graduating, he joined the Institute of Historical Studies at the Peiping Academy (a predecessor of the Chinese Academy of Sciences) and worked on its excavation team at the Doujitai archaeological site in Baoji, Shaanxi Province, where he spent three years, from 1934 to 1937, under the guidance of senior archaeologist Xu Xusheng, who had a significant influence on him. Su completed the excavation report in 1945, but it was published only in 1948.

In 1940, Su wrote a book analyzing the types of li (鬲) pottery tripods excavated at Doujitai, but lost the manuscript in the chaos of the Second Sino-Japanese War. Some of the contents were published in his excavation report, but it took 40 years before an abridged version of the study was finally published. The book was highly regarded as "probably the most ambitious and systematic project of pottery typology" in Chinese archaeology. Su used li vessel typology to determine ethnic affiliations of archaeological sites, and his methodology has been adopted by generations of Chinese scholars.

After the founding of the People's Republic of China in 1949, Su became a fellow of the Institute of Archaeology, Chinese Academy of Social Sciences (under the Chinese Academy of Sciences until 1977). In 1952, he co-founded China's first university archaeology program at Peking University, then under the Department of History, where he trained many of China's leading archaeologists who have been greatly influenced by him. After the death of Xia Nai, Su was elected to succeed him as President of the Chinese Archaeology Association in 1986.

Su Bingqi died on 30 June 1997. In 2005, his biography, written by his son Su Kaizhi (苏恺之), was published by Joint Publishing.

== Multi-region model ==
After the disruption to academic research caused by the Cultural Revolution, in 1979 Su proposed the influential "regional systems and cultural types" (区系类型) model of Chinese Neolithic cultural development (published in 1981 in the journal Wenwu). Rejecting the traditional point of view that the Central Plain (Yellow River valley) was the cradle of Chinese civilization and radiated out to backward regions in the rest of China, Su argued that archaeological data had proven that ancient cultures were developing simultaneously in multiple regions and influenced each other, including the Central Plain.

Many scholars, especially Su's students, consider the multi-region model his most important theoretical contribution. In the view of Li Feng of Columbia University, although the theory "does little more than synthesize what had already been revealed by the extensive archaeological work" of the recent past, it was a powerful tool for analyzing prehistoric development in Neolithic China. According to archaeologist Kwang-chih Chang of Harvard University, Su's theory legitimized a view of ancient China that had been regarded as heresy. Based on Su's model, Chang developed the model of "Chinese Interaction Sphere" in 1986. Their theories have since been widely accepted in academia.

== Bibliography ==
- Chang, Kwang-chih (1999). "China on the eve of the historical period". In Loewe, Michael; Shaughnessy, Edward L. (eds.). The Cambridge History of Ancient China: From the Origins of Civilization to 221 BC. Cambridge University Press. ISBN 978-0-521-47030-8.
- Li, Feng (2013). Early China: A Social and Cultural History. Cambridge University Press. ISBN 978-1-107-65234-7.
- Liu, Li; Chen, Xingcan (2012). The Archaeology of China: From the Late Paleolithic to the Early Bronze Age. Cambridge University Press. ISBN 978-0-521-64310-8.
- Murray, Tim (1999). Encyclopedia of Archaeology: The Great Archaeologists, Volume 2. ABC-CLIO. ISBN 978-1-57607-199-1.
- Wang, Tao (March 1997). "Establishing the Chinese archaeological school: Su Bingqi and contemporary Chinese archaeology". Antiquity. 71 (271): 31–36. doi:10.1017/S0003598X00084507. ISSN 0003-598X. S2CID 163489280.
- Zhang, Liangren (2014). "China". In Carver, Martin; Gaydarska, Bisserka; Montón-Subías, Sandra (eds.). Field Archaeology from Around the World: Ideas and Approaches. Springer. ISBN 978-3-319-09819-7.
