= Huang Wenbi =

- 黄文弼
- Born: April 23, 1893; Hanchuan, Hubei, Qing dynasty
- Died: December 18, 1966 (aged 73); China
- Occupations: Archaeologist, professor, archaeology conservator

Academic background
- Education: Peking University

Academic work
- Discipline: Archaeology
- Sub-discipline: Archaeology of China, urban archaeology, conservation and restoration of archaeological sites
- Institutions: Peking University; Sino-Swedish Expedition; Central Committee for the Preservation of Antiquities; Institute of Archaeology, Chinese Academy of Social Sciences
- Main interests: Inner Mongolia, Xinjiang

Huang Wenbi (Chinese: 黄文弼; Wade–Giles: Huang Wen-pi; April 23, 1893 – December 18, 1966) was a Chinese archaeologist specializing in Xinjiang.

Huang was born in Hanchuan, Hubei Province. After graduating from Peking University in 1918, he became a faculty member of the university. From 1927 to 1930, he participated in the Sino-Swedish Expedition to Inner Mongolia and Xinjiang with Sven Hedin and Xu Xusheng. He was also a research fellow on the Sino-Swedish Expedition of 1934-37.

In 1928 and 1930, he worked in Turfan with other members of Hedin’s expedition, while also studying Gaochang and the cave monasteries, Bezeklik in particular. In 1930, he excavated in Yarqoto, before returning to Gaochang and then moving on to the burial grounds of Astana. A new cycle of work was undertaken in 1933 and then resumed in 1943.

As a member of the Central Committee for the Preservation of Antiquities, he was stationed in Xi'an to be a director to research the Stele Forest from 1935. In 1947, he returned to Beijing, where he worked in the Institute of Archaeology of the Academy of Sciences of the People’s Republic of China. He conducted a number of further archeological research trips to the western regions from 1950, in particular exploring the historic city of Gaochang. His last expedition to Chinese Turkestan took place in 1958.

He died in 1966.

== Works ==
- Gaochang zhuanji, Peking 1931
- Gaochang zhuanji zhuiyan, Peking 1931
- Gaochang taoji 1934
- Luobu Nao'er kaogu ji (The Exploration around Lob Nor: A report on the exploratory work during 1930 and 1934; Chinese with English translation of the preface and the table of contents), Peking 1948.
- Gaochang tuanji, Peking 1951.
- Gaochang zhuanji 1951
- Talimu Pendi kaogu ji, Peking 1958.
- Tulufan kaogu ji 1954, 1958
- Huang Wenbi Meng Xin Kaocha riji 1927–1930 [Huang Wenbi's Mongolia and Xinjiang Survey Diary], Peking: Wenwu chubanshe 1990
- Xinjiang kaogu fajue baokap, 1983
- Xibei shi di luncong, 1981
- Gaochang zhuanji, Beijing 1931
- Gaochang zhuanji zhuiyan, Beijing 1931
- Gaochang taoji 1934
- Luobu Nao'er kaogu ji (The Exploration around Praise Nor: A report on the exploratory work during 1930 and 1934, Chinese with English Gaochang tuanji, Beijing 1951.
- Gaochang zhuanji 1951
- Talimu Pendi kaogu ji, Beijing 1958.
- Tulufan kaogu ji 1954, 1958
- Huang Wenbi Meng Xin Kaocha riji 1927-1930 [Huang Wenbi's Mongolia and Xinjiang Survey Diary], Beijing: Wenwu chubanshe 1990
- Xinjiang kaogu fajue baokap, 1983
- Xibei shi di luncong, 1981
