= Huang Zhanyue =

Chinese archaeologist (1926–2019)

- 黄展岳
- Born: August 1926; Nan'an, Fujian, Republic of China
- Died: April 22, 2019 (aged 92); China
- Occupations: Archaeologist, professor, field researcher, academic journal editor
- Known for: Excavation of the Mausoleum of the Nanyue King

Academic background
- Education: Peking University; Institute of Archaeology, Chinese Academy of Sciences
- Influences: Pei Wenzhong and Xia Nai

Academic work
- Discipline: Archaeology
- Sub-discipline: Chinese history
- Institutions: Chinese Academy of Social Sciences, Xiamen University
- Main interests: Imperial China from the Han to Tang dynasties
- Notable works: Human Sacrifice in Ancient China [国古代的人牲人殉] (1990); Mausoleum of the Nanyue King of the Western Han [西汉南越王墓] (1991)

Huang Zhanyue (simplified Chinese: 黄展岳; traditional Chinese: 黃展岳; Pe̍h-ōe-jī: N̂g Tián-ga̍k; August 1926 – 22 April 2019) was a Chinese archaeologist. He was a professor at the Institute of Archaeology, Chinese Academy of Social Sciences and an honorary academician of the Chinese Academy of Social Sciences. His research focus was on the archaeology of China from the Han dynasty to the Tang dynasty.

== Biography ==
Huang was born in August 1926 into a poor peasant family in Nan'an, Fujian, Republic of China. He was accepted into the Department of History of Peking University in 1950, and chose archaeology as his major two years later. After graduating in 1954, he was assigned to work for the Institute of Archaeology of the Chinese Academy of Sciences (now part of the Chinese Academy of Social Sciences). In 1956, Huang became a doctoral student at the Institute of Archaeology with a focus on the archaeology of Han to Tang dynasties.

During the Cultural Revolution, he was sent to perform hard labour at a May Seventh Cadre School in Henan. When the journal Acta Archaeologica Sinica resumed publication in 1972, Huang was transferred back to the Institute of Archaeology to serve as an editor. He later became deputy chief editor of the journal.

Huang was a professor at the Graduate School of the Chinese Academy of Social Sciences and an adjunct professor at Xiamen University. In 2011, he was elected an honorary academician of the Chinese Academy of Social Sciences.

Huang died on 22 April 2019 aged 92.

== Excavations and publications ==
Huang's research focus was on the archaeology of China from the Han dynasty to the Tang dynasty. He participated in or led excavations in Luoyang, Xi'an, Kunming, Guangzhou, and at other sites. He published nine academic books (including three co-authored with others) and more than 200 research papers and excavation reports.

In 1953, Huang participated in his first excavations at Shaogou in Luoyang and Erligang in Zhengzhou, under the direction of Pei Wenzhong and Xia Nai. He authored the pottery section of the excavation report Shaogou Han Tombs of Luoyang (1959).

From 1958 to 1960, he led the excavation of the remains of Han dynasty imperial ritual buildings (including the Mingtang, Piyong, Taixue, ancestral temple, and others) south of Chang'an. Owing to the Cultural Revolution and the dismissal of many of his colleagues, he was unable to publish the excavation report until 1998.

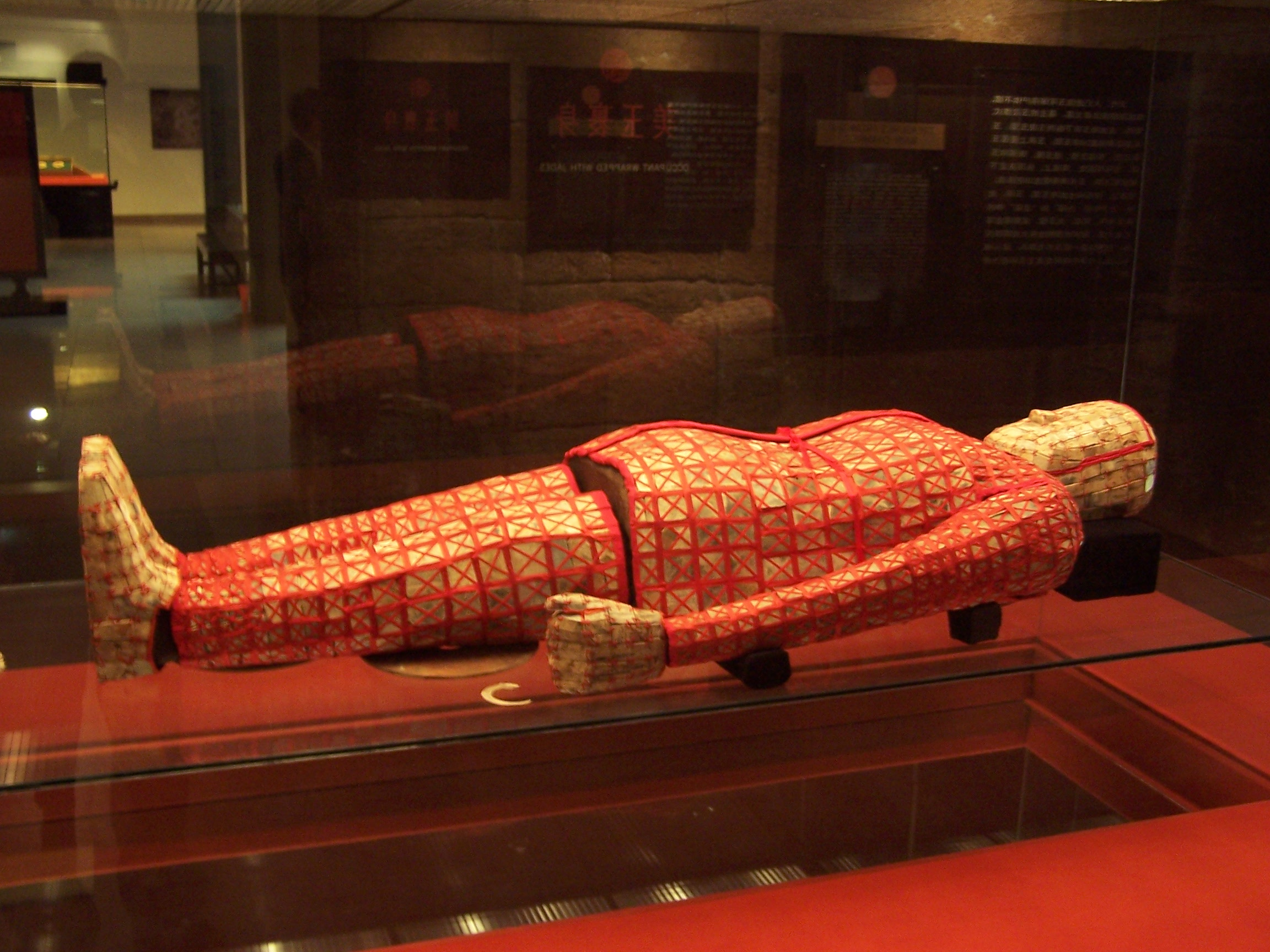
The jade burial suit of King Zhao Mo, from his mausoleum excavated by Huang and Mai Yinghao

In 1983, Huang led the excavation of the Mausoleum of the Nanyue King (Zhao Mo, died 122 BC) in Guangzhou, together with Mai Yinghao. They published the two-volume excavation report Mausoleum of the Nanyue King of the Western Han (西汉南越王墓) in 1991, which won several national awards including the 1993 Chinese Academy of Social Sciences Research Award and the 1995 Xia Nai Archaeology Prize (First Class).

In 1990, he wrote Human Sacrifice in Ancient China (中国古代的人牲人殉), an overview of the topic which combines research from historical documents and archaeological discoveries. It also won the 1993 Chinese Academy of Social Sciences Research Award. In 2004, he published an updated version of the book, entitled A General Treatise on Ancient Human Sacrifice (古代人牲人殉通论). It has been translated into Japanese.
