= Wang Zhongshu =

Chinese archaeologist (1925 – 2015)

Wang Zhongshu 王仲殊
- Born: 15 October 1925; Ningbo, Zhejiang, China
- Died: 24 September 2015 (aged 89)
- Education: Zhejiang University; Peking University
- Awards: Fukuoka Asian Culture Prize (1996)
- Scientific career
- Fields: Archaeology
- Workplaces: Institute of Archaeology, Chinese Academy of Social Sciences

Wang Zhongshu (Chinese: 王仲殊; 15 October 1925 – 24 September 2015) was a Chinese archaeologist who helped to establish and develop the field of archaeology in China. One of the most prominent Asian archaeologists, he was awarded the Grand Prize of the Fukuoka Asian Culture Prize in 1996 by the Japanese city of Fukuoka. Wang specialized in the archaeology of China's Han and Tang dynasties, as well as Japanese archaeology. He is noted for his achievements in the study of ancient Sino-Japanese relations.

== Biography ==
Wang Zhongshu was born in 1925 in Ningbo, Zhejiang province during the Republic of China era. His father was a high school Chinese teacher who also worked for Tian Yi Ge, one of the oldest libraries in China. Influenced by his father, Wang was well versed in classical Chinese literature and history. During the Japanese invasion of China he was forced to flee his hometown as a refugee and completed his middle school education while on the run.

After the end of World War II, Wang was accepted by several top Chinese universities in 1946, and chose to enter Zhejiang University in his home province, where he studied under the historian Tan Qixiang and excelled in the subjects of Chinese history and the Japanese language. In 1949 the Communists won the Chinese Civil War and established the People's Republic of China. Zhejiang University was being reorganized by the new government, and following Tan's advice, Wang Zhongshu decided to transfer to Peking University.

After graduating from the Department of History of Peking University in July 1950, Wang joined the newly established Institute of Archaeology of the Chinese Academy of Sciences, working and studying under Xia Nai, the institute's vice director who is considered a founder of modern Chinese archaeology. After the major disruptions of the Cultural Revolution (1966–76), during which numerous intellectuals, including Xia Nai, were persecuted, in 1978 Wang became the vice director of the Institute of Archaeology, still working under Xia Nai, now director. He succeeded Xia as director of the institute in 1982, and held the position until 1988.

Wang died on 24 September 2015.

== Academic achievements ==
Wang's career path was a life spent in important historical sites undertaking excavations. In October 1950 he joined his first major excavation in Huixian, Henan province, focussing on Han dynasty tombs under the guidance of Xia Nai. From 1956 to 1962 he was the lead archaeologist in the excavation of the Han capital Chang'an. In 1964 Wang oversaw the excavations of the Balhae tombs in Dunhua, Jilin and Shangjing Longquanfu, the Balhae capital in Ning'an, Heilongjiang. His excavation report for the Balhae projects won an award from the National Social Science Fund and the Guo Moruo Chinese History Prize. His other major excavation projects include those of the Changsha and Mancheng Han tombs. In Mancheng, he excavated and studied the tomb of King Jing of Zhongshan and his wife.

In 1959 Wang published a paper in the Chinese journal Kaogu (Archaeology), comparing the King of Dian gold seal which had been discovered in China's Yunnan province in 1956, with the King of Na gold seal of Japan. The authenticity of the King of Na seal, discovered in Fukuoka in 1784, had been in doubt. By comparing the similarities between the two seals, both cast by Han dynasty emperors, Wang convincingly proved its authenticity.

Wang's work revolved around the Warring States period, and the Qin, Han, Sui, and Tang dynasties. He contributed immensely to the study of the Han dynasty. He treated features such as China's castle town systems and tomb-building methods extensively in his works. It was his numerous years of work on archaeological sites that gave him the deep knowledge of the period.

Wang was known for his unique approach and study of subjects ranging from castle towns, tombs, and ancient bronze mirrors. His contributions to the development of archaeology in China earned much reverence in the country as well as academic circles in Asia. He was an honorary professor of the National Cuzco University of Peru, a corresponding member of the German Archaeological Institute, and an evaluation committee member of the Asian History Association of Japan.

=== Archaeology in Japan ===
After the discovery in 1972 of the Takamatsuzuka Tomb in Japan, Wang developed a deeper interest in Japanese archaeology and history. He focused his research on sankakubuchishinjukyo, the triangular-rimmed bronze mirrors bearing mythical and animal designs, which were discovered in the tomb. The research led Wang to propose a new theory about the history of Sino-Japanese relations.

== Selected works ==
- Han Civilization (1982), translated by K. C. Chang and collaborators.
