= Mai Yinghao =

Chinese archaeologist (1929–2016)

- 麦英豪
- Born: July 15, 1929; Panyu District, Guangdong, Republic of China
- Died: November 28, 2016 (aged 87); Guangzhou, China
- Occupations: Archaeologist, professor, museum director, field researcher
- Known for: Excavation of the Mausoleum of the Nanyue King

Academic background
- Education: Guangzhou University; Guangzhou Municipal Cultural Heritage Administration

Academic work
- Discipline: Archaeology
- Sub-discipline: Chinese history, cultural resources management, archaeological conservation
- Institutions: Guangzhou Municipal Cultural Heritage Administration; Guangzhou Museum
- Notable works: Mausoleum of the Nanyue King of the Western Han [西汉南越王墓] (1991)

Mai Yinghao (Chinese: 麦英豪; 15 July 1929 – 28 November 2016) was a Chinese archaeologist. He led the excavation of three major archaeological sites in Guangzhou: the Qin dynasty shipyard, the Mausoleum of the Nanyue King, and the Royal Palace and Garden of the Nanyue Kingdom. He served as Director of the Guangzhou Museum.

== Career ==
Mai was born on 15 July 1929 into a poor family in Panyu, Guangdong, Republic of China. He studied education at Guangzhou University but did not graduate. In September 1952, he began working at the Guangzhou Municipal Cultural Heritage Administration and received training in archaeology.

From 1953 to the 1980s, Mai worked for more than three decades in field archaeology. He led the excavation of a number of major archaeological sites in and near Guangzhou, including the Xicun Kiln (西村窑) in the 1950s, the Qin dynasty shipyard in 1975, the Mausoleum of the Nanyue King (Zhao Mo) in 1983, and the Royal Palace and Garden of the Nanyue kingdom. He also advised on the excavation and preservation of the Nanyue sluice and the two royal mausoleums of the Southern Han kingdom. In addition, he excavated more than 700 tombs dating from the Qin dynasty to the Ming dynasty.

In 1991, Mai Yinghao and Huang Zhanyue (co-leader of the excavation) published the two-volume excavation report Mausoleum of the Nanyue King of the Western Han (西汉南越王墓). It won several national awards including the 1993 Chinese Academy of Social Sciences Research Award and the 1995 Xia Nai Archaeology Prize (First Class).

Mai was a strong advocate for building on-site museums at major archaeological sites. His efforts resulted in the establishment of the Museum of the Mausoleum of the Nanyue King and the Nanyue Palace Museum. He served as Director of the Guangzhou Museum.

== Personal life ==
Mai was married to Li Jin (黎金), a fellow archaeologist. They had a son named Mai Jia (麦稼).

Mai was diagnosed with cancer in July 2015. He died on 28 November 2016 in Guangzhou, at the age of 87. On 12 December, a special exhibition on his life was held at the Guangzhou Museum.

== Gallery ==
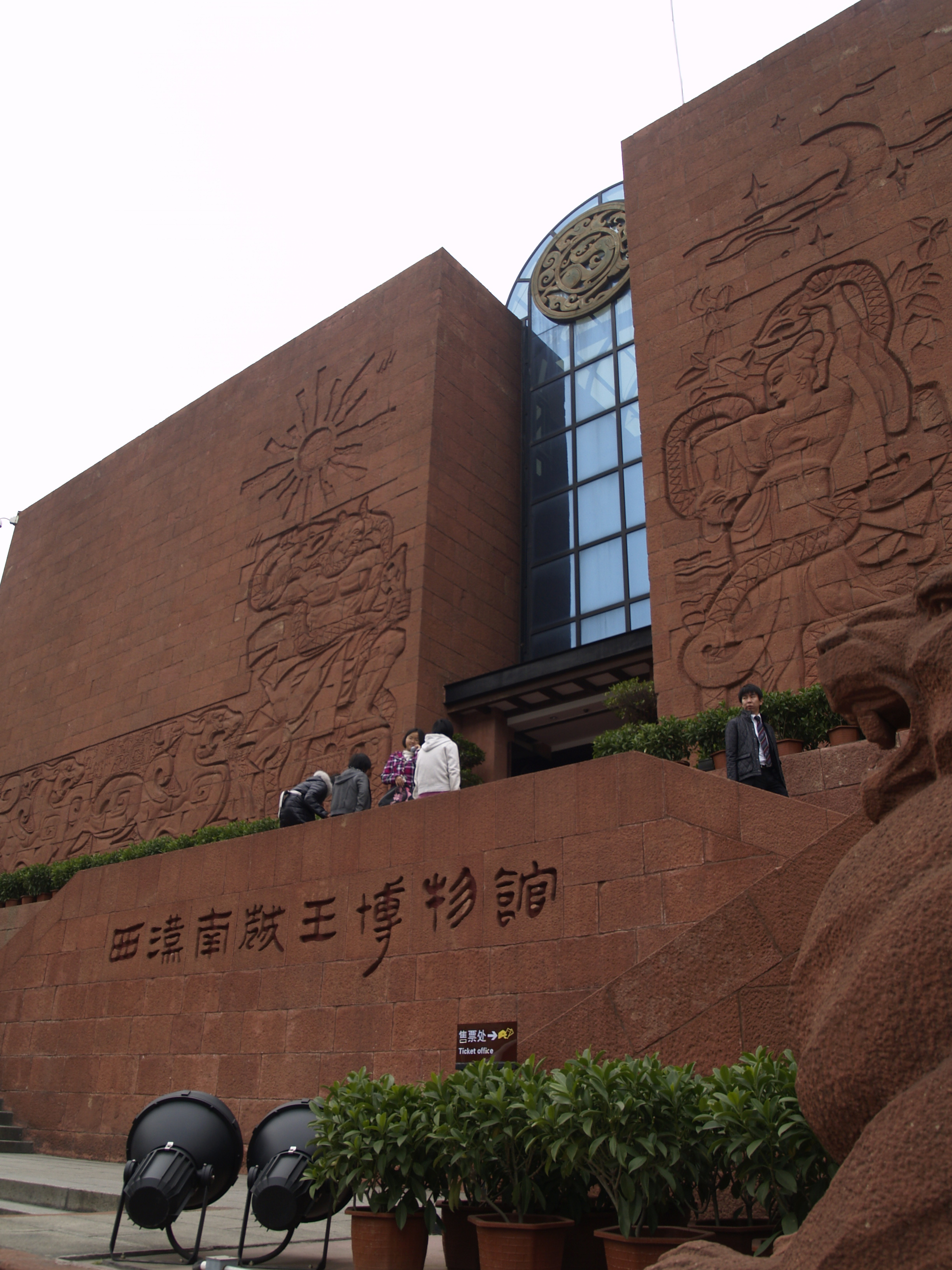
Museum of the Mausoleum of the Nanyue King

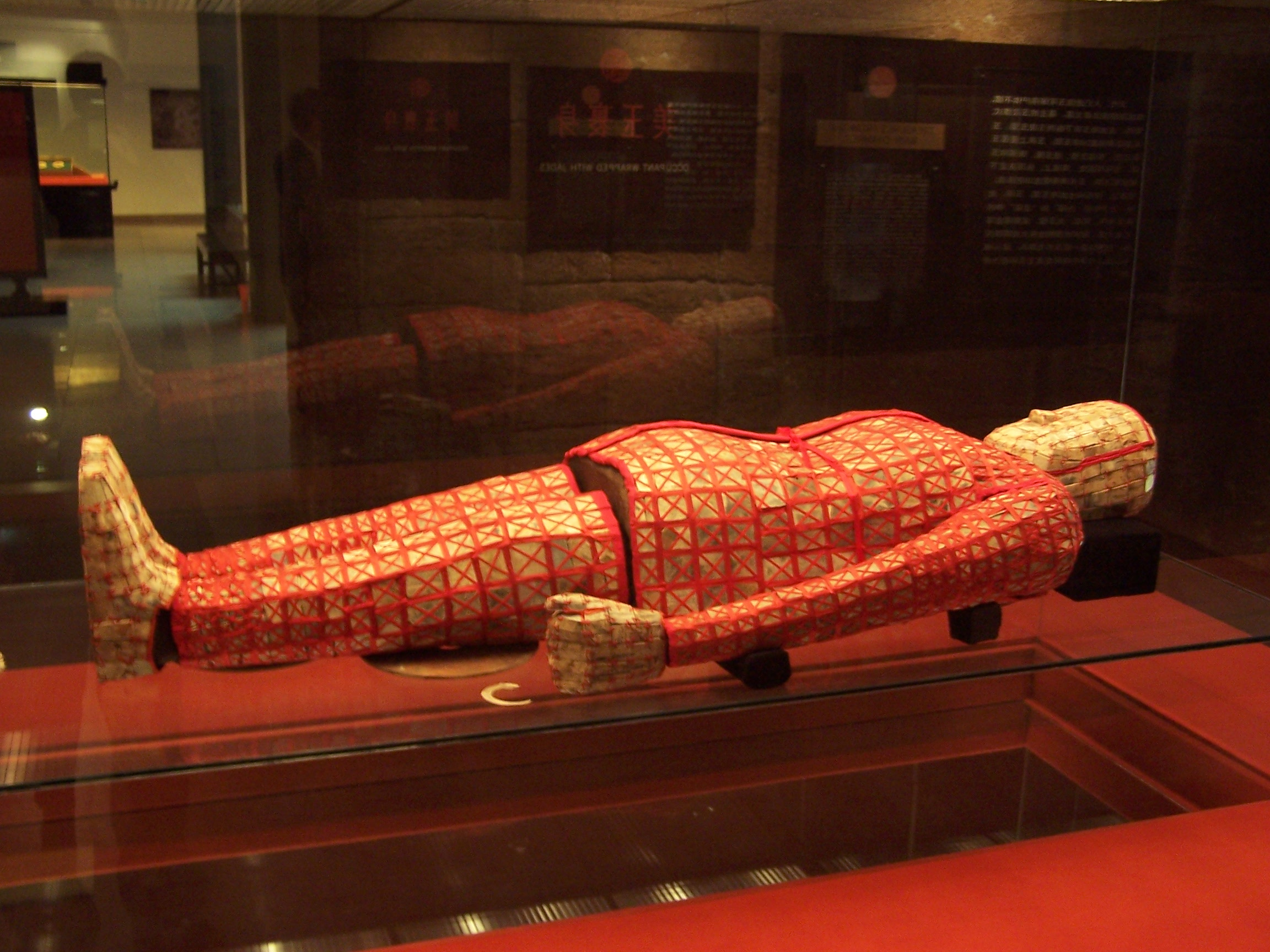
Si lü yu yi (silk thread jade burial suit), at the Museum of the Western Han Dynasty / Mausoleum of the Nanyue King, Guangzhou
