= Yu Xingwu =

Chinese philologist and exegesis interpreter (1896–1984)

Yu Xingwu 于省吾
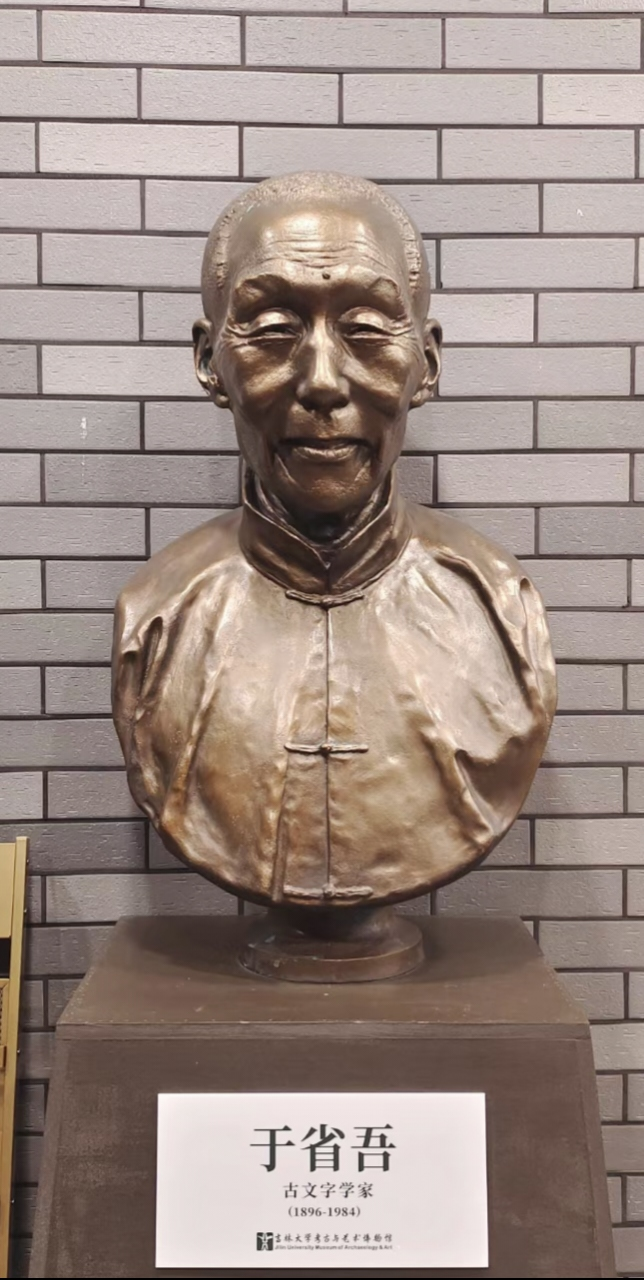
- Statue of Yu Shengwu, located in Jilin University.
- Born: 23 December 1896; Haicheng, Liaoning, Qing China
- Died: 17 July 1984; Changchun, PRC
- Occupations: philologist, historian

Yu Xingwu (Chinese: 于省吾; 1896–1984) was a Chinese philologist and exegesis interpreter. He was born in Haicheng, Liaoning, and graduated from Shenyang National Normal School in 1919. During the 1930s and 1940s he was a professor at Peking University, Yenching University and Fu Jen Catholic University, and from 1955 he taught at People's University of Northeast China (today's Jilin University).

Yu is mainly known for his textual research of Oracle bone script and Bronze script. He also spent much time on interpreting pre-Qin classics. After 1950s, Yu also published several papers about pre-Qin social history.
