= Institute of Archaeology, Chinese Academy of Social Sciences =

Facility in Beijing, China

The Institute of Archaeology (IA; Chinese: 中国社会科学院考古研究所) is a constituent institute of the Chinese Academy of Social Sciences (CASS), based in Beijing, China. It was founded on 1 August 1950, as part of the Chinese Academy of Sciences. Its original 20 or so researchers came from the Beiping Research Academy and the Institute of History and Philology, Academia Sinica of the Republic of China. In 1977, the institute became part of the newly established CASS.

== Academic departments ==
- Department of Prehistoric Archaeology, established 1953
- Department of Xia, Shang and Zhou Archaeology, established 1953
- Research Department of Han to Tang Archaeology, established 1953
- Research Center for Frontier Archaeology and Foreign Archaeology, established 2002
- Center for Scientific Archaeology, established 1995
- Archaeology Press, established 1955
- Center for Archaeological Data and Information, established 1996

In addition, the Research Center for Ancient Civilizations and the Conservation and Research Center of Cultural Heritage are also affiliated with IA CASS. The institute is also responsible for the Department of Archaeology of the Graduate School of CASS.

== Journals ==
The institute publishes several academic journals in Chinese:

- Kaogu (Archaeology), monthly
- Acta Archaeologica Sinica (Kaogu Xuebao), quarterly
- Kaoguxue jikan (Archaeology Periodicals), annually
- Kaoguxue cankao ziliao (aperiodically)
- Zhongguo kaoguxue nianjian (Annals of Chinese Archaeology)

It also publishes China's only English-language archaeological journal, Chinese Archaeology.

== Major excavations ==
- Banpo, in Xi'an, Shaanxi
- Miaodigou, in Shan County, Henan
- Qujialing, in Jingshan County, Hubei
- Liuwan, in Ledu, Qinghai
- Erlitou, in Yanshi, Henan
- Yinxu, in Anyang, Henan
- Fenghao, in Shaanxi
- Eastern Zhou dynasty Luoyang, in Henan
- Han dynasty Chang'an, in Shaanxi
- Mancheng Han tomb in Hebei
- Han and Wei dynasty Luoyang
- Sui and Tang dynasty Daxing-Chang'an
- Sui and Tang dynasty Luoyang
- Khanbaliq, capital of the Yuan dynasty, in Beijing
- Dingling Mausoleum of the Ming dynasty

== List of directors ==
- Zheng Zhenduo (deputy directors: Liang Siyong and Xia Nai)
- Yin Da (尹达)
- Xia Nai
- Wang Zhongshu (1982–1988)
- Xu Pingfang (徐苹芳, 1988–1992)
- Ren Shinan (任式楠, 1992–1998)
- Liu Qingzhu (刘庆柱, 1998–2006)
- Wang Wei (王巍, 2006–2017)
- Chen Xingcan (陈星灿, 2017–present)

== Other prominent archaeologists ==
- Xu Xusheng, discoverer of the Erlitou culture
- Zheng Zhenxiang, discovered the Shang dynasty tomb of Fuhao
- Chen Mengjia, authority on oracle bones and ancient Chinese bronzes
- Guo Baojun (郭宝钧)
- Huang Wenbi
- Huang Zhanyue
- Su Bingqi
