= Archaeology of China =

The archaeology of China is researched intensively in the universities of the region and also attracts considerable international interest on account of the region's civilizations. Scholar-officials during the Song dynasty (960–1279) who took up antiquarian pursuits were the first to systematically analyze objects and monuments from China's antiquity.

The application of modern scientific archaeology to Chinese sites began in 1921, when Johan Gunnar Andersson first excavated the Yangshao Village sites in Henan. Andersson believed that prehistoric Chinese culture had a "Western Origin". In fact, most archaeologists at that time believed that all human civilizations, including Chinese, originated in the broader Middle East and then spread to different regions of the world. This statement caused an uproar in China. Chinese archaeologists hope to find evidence to refute this argument, which has led to a series of Chinese-led archaeological projects.

Excavations from 1928 at Anyang, also in northern Henan, by the newly formed Academia Sinica by anthropologist Li Ji uncovered a literate civilization identified with the late stages of the Shang dynasty of early Chinese records. Earlier cities in northern Henan were discovered at Zhengzhou in 1952 and Erlitou in 1959. More recently prehistoric cities such as Panlongcheng and Sanxingdui have been discovered in other parts of China.

== History ==
Beginning in the Song dynasty (960-1279), many members of the Chinese gentry began to pursue antiquarian hobbies such as art collection, leading to scholar-officials retrieving several ancient relics from archaeological sites, such as ancient ceremonial vessels that were then used in state rituals. Scholar-officials claimed to have discovered ancient bronze vessels that were created and used during the Shang dynasty (1600-1046 BCE) due to the fact that they contained Shang era characters. Although romanticism abounded around these artifacts (including imaginative recreations by scholar-officials that were not based on proper evidence), the fanciful nature of the antiquarian pursuit was heavily criticized by Shen Kuo in his Dream Pool Essays. Shen objected to the notion that the vessels were created by famous sages or ancient aristocrats, correctly observing that the artifacts were more likely made by ancient artisans or commoners from previous eras. Shen also believed that the antiquarian pursuit of archaeology simply to enhance state ritual was frivolous, as he was far more in favor of an interdisciplinary approach to the study of archaeology and emphasized the study of functionality and process of manufacture for artifacts.

== Archaeological finds ==
In the 20th century, archaeologists made tens of thousands of discoveries in China. In 2001, the Institute of Archaeology of the Chinese Academy of Social Sciences organized a poll of experts who selected China's 100 major archaeological discoveries in the 20th century, with Yinxu receiving the most votes.

One of the archaeological discoveries of China is a Guanyindong Palaeolithic cave site, discovered in 1964 by archaeologist Pei Wenzhong in Qianxi County, Guizhou. During several archaeological excavations in the 1960s and 1970s, most of the material remains were gathered from the cave entrance. About one-third of the artifacts were extracted from the upper layer which is called "Layer 2" or "Group A" by archaeologist Prof. Li Yanxian, and the rest of them were collected from the lower layers- "Layers 4–8" or "Group B". According to Associate Professor Bo Li, besides several non-Levallois flakes, archaeologists examined more than 2000 stone artifacts from Guanyindong and revealed proof of Levallois concepts on 45 samples (including cores, flakes and tools). It contains the earliest evidence of stone artefacts made using the Levallois technique in China. In November 2018, the discovery of these stones dated to approximately 170,000-80,000 years ago were announced by the University of Wollongong.

A number of Chinese artifacts dating from the Tang dynasty and Song dynasty, some of which had been owned by Emperor Zhenzong were excavated and then came into the hands of the Kuomintang Muslim General Ma Hongkui, who refused to publicize the findings. Among the artifacts were a white marble tablet from the Tang dynasty, gold nails, and bands made out of metal. It was not until after Ma died, that his wife went to Taiwan in 1971 from America to bring the artifacts to Chiang Kai-shek, who turned them over to the Taipei National Palace Museum.

What were identified as the oldest-known noodles were found in an earthen bowl at the 4,000-year-old site of Lajia on the Yellow River in China. The noodles, discovered by Ye Maolin of the Chinese Academy of Social Sciences and analyzed by Lu Houyuan of the Chinese Academy of Sciences and colleagues, were 50 cm long and had been made with two strains of millet.

== Future ==
For a long time, archaeology has been associated with history in China. In colleges and universities with archaeology majors, archaeology is also a secondary discipline subordinate to history. Regardless of whether it is superior or inferior to Western archaeology in anthropology, changes are inevitable with the development of the times. After the emergence of "new archaeology", it has become an irresistible trend for many scientific factors to intervene in archaeology. Using the methods and techniques of natural science, the research scope of archaeology has been continuously expanded, and the information obtained has become increasingly diversified.

== Institutions ==
- Institute of Archaeology, Chinese Academy of Social Sciences
- Chinese Society of Archaeology

== See also ==
- List of Chinese archaeologists
- Chinese archaeologists
- Stanislaw Kuczera (1928-2020), Soviet and Russian sinologist and expert on Chinese archaeology - Wikipedia page in Russian
- History of China

== Sources ==
- Fairbank, John King; Goldman, Merle (2006) [1992], China: A New History (2nd enlarged ed.), Cambridge; London: The Belknap Press of Harvard University Press, ISBN 978-0-674-01828-0
- Fraser, Julius Thomas; Haber, Francis C. (1986), Time, Science, and Society in China and the West, Amherst, MA: University of Massachusetts Press, ISBN 978-0-87023-495-8
