= Chen Xingcan =

Chinese archaeologist

- 陈星灿
- Born: December 1964 (age 61); Changge, Henan, China
- Education: Graduate School, Chinese Academy of Social Sciences
- Occupations: Educator, Researcher
- Notable work: Research on the History of Chinese Prehistoric Archaeology, Archaeological Essays

Chen Xingcan (陳星燦) (born December 12, 1964, in Henan Province) is a Chinese archaeologist specializing in the archaeology of China.

Chen obtained a B.A. in anthropology (specialization: archaeology) from Sun Yat-sen University in Guangzhou in 1985. From there he went directly to study at the Chinese Academy of Social Sciences in Beijing, where he got his M.A. in archaeology in 1988. Chen earned his doctorate from the same institution in 1991, with the dissertation topic Zhongguo Shiqian Kaoguxueshi Yanjiu (1895–1949) [History of Chinese Archaeology (1895–1949)]. In 1993-1994 and 2001–2003, he was a visiting scholar at Harvard University in the United States. In 1998, he was a visiting scholar at La Trobe University in Australia. Currently, Chen is Research Fellow and Director of the Institute of Archaeology, Chinese Academy of Social Sciences. He is also an Executive Committee Member of the Tang Center for Ancient China at Columbia University.

For more than a quarter century, Chen has led excavations in the middle Yellow River area. His work has included international campaigns with Americans and Australian colleagues. His research interests include archaeological method and theory, the history of archaeology, and the development of agriculture and of states.

== Selected publications ==
- The Archaeology of China: From Late Palaeolithic to Early Bronze Age (Cambridge 2012)
- Zhongguo shi qian kao gu xue shi yan jiu (1895–1949) [Study on history of prehistoric archaeology in China (1895–1949)] (Beijing 2007)
- State Formation in Early China (co-authored with Li Liu, London 2003)
- China Before China (co-authored with Magnus Fiskesjö, Stockholm 2004)
