= Wang Ziyun =

Chinese artist

Wang Ziyun (王子云 (王子雲) March 1899 – 1990) was a Chinese oil painter, sculptor and archaeologist, born in Xuzhou, Jiangsu, China.

He went to Shanghai arts junior college in 1916. He cofounded the Apollo Art Research Institute in 1922 with Li Yishi, Wang Yuezhi and Wu Fading and the Beijing College of Art in 1924 with Wang Yuezhi. From 1931 to 1936, Wang moved to Paris, France to study sculpture.

After the Second Sino-Japanese War broke out in 1937, he returned home and found and rescued a lot of Chinese national treasures, becoming professor of sculpture at Hangzhou Academy, where he taught Wu Guanzhong. In 1949 he became professor of art history at Chengdu Art Academy and in 1952 a professor at Northwest Art Academy. Wang Ziyun went to Shaanxi, and to Gansu, Qinghai and other places to carry on research on China's ancient legacy, as leader of the Northwest Art and Relics Research Team.
