= Cao Wei (curator) =

Chinese professor of archaeology

- 曹玮
- Occupations: Archaeologist, professor
- Awards: Prince of Asturias Award for Social Science (2010)

Academic work
- Discipline: Archaeology, social sciences, curation
- Institutions: Terracotta Army Museum

Cao Wei (Chinese: 曹玮) is a Chinese professor of archaeology. He is currently serving as the chief curator of the Terracotta Army museum in Xi'an, China. In 2010, he and his archaeological team received the Prince of Asturias Awards in social sciences.

== Career ==
In 2012, he welcomed Myanmar's president Thein Sein to the Terracotta Army museum. In 2013, he accompanied South Korea's president Park Geun-hye and her delegation to visit the Terracotta Army.

In 2014, he led US First Lady Michelle Obama through the archeological site.

== Awards ==
In 2010, Cao Wei and his team received the Prince of Asturias Awards in Social Sciences for their archaeological discoveries.

== Books ==
- Cao, Wei (2002). The Inscribed Oracle Bones at Zhouyuan (First ed.). Beijing: China Publishing Group. ISBN 978-7506256650. (in Chinese)
