= Kaogu =

Monthly academic journal

- Discipline: archaeology
- Language: Chinese

Publication details
- Former name(s): Kaogu Tongxun, 考古通讯
- Publisher: Institute of Archaeology, Chinese Academy of Social Sciences (China)
- Frequency: monthly

Standard abbreviations
- ISO 4: Kaogu

Indexing
- ISSN: 0453-2899

Links
- Journal homepage; China Academic Journals Database

Kaogu (Chinese: 考古; lit. 'Archaeology') is a peer-reviewed monthly academic journal of Chinese archaeology, published by the Institute of Archaeology of the Chinese Academy of Social Sciences.

== History ==
The predecessor to what would become Kaogu was published from 1934 to 1937, with each issue containing only a couple of articles. The earliest version of the journal was published in 1955, however it appeared irregularly until 1959. Regular publication was temporarily suspended between 1966 and 1971, during the Cultural Revolution.

== Content ==
The journal publishes summarized descriptions of excavations across China, but more recently research articles have also been included. Following cultural heritage laws, the work of foreigners on China must first be published in Chinese, and so Kaogu is also the main repository of data on international joint research between Chinese and non-Chinese that intensified in the 1990s. Most articles contain short English summaries.
