= Acta Archaeologica Sinica =

Academic journal

- Discipline: Archaeology
- Language: Chinese

Publication details
- Former name: Zhongguo Kaogu Xuebao
- Publisher: Institute of Archaeology, Chinese Academy of Social Sciences (China)
- Frequency: quarterly

Standard abbreviations
- ISO 4: Acta Archaeol. Sin.

Indexing
- ISSN: 0453-2902

Links
- Journal homepage; China Academic Journals Full-text Database

Acta Archaeologica Sinica, also known by its Chinese title Kaogu Xuebao (Chinese: 考古学报; lit. 'Journal of Archaeology'), is a quarterly academic journal published by the Institute of Archaeology, Chinese Academy of Social Sciences.

First published in 1936 as Field Archaeology Report (田野考古报告), the journal focuses on the publication of excavation reports and related archaeological research papers. Its Chinese title was changed to Zhongguo Kaogu Xuebao (Chinese: 中国考古学报; lit. 'Journal of Chinese Archaeology') in 1947, and changed again to the current name in 1953.

According to SCImago Journal Rank (SJR), the journal h-index is 13, ranking it to Q2 in Archeology (arts and humanities) and in Archeology.
