= Liang Siyong =

Chinese anthropologist and archaeologist

- 梁思永
- Born: 13 November 1904; Portuguese Macau
- Died: 2 April 1954 (aged 49); Beijing, People's Republic of China
- Education: Tsinghua University (BS); Harvard University (MA)
- Occupations: Archaeologist, anthropologist, field researcher
- Organization: Institute of Archaeology of the Chinese Academy of Sciences
- Known for: Introducing archaeology into China
- Notable work: Chengziya site excavation report [城子崖遺址發掘報告] (1934)
- Spouse: Li Fuman (m. 1931)
- Parent: Liang Qichao (father)

Chinese name
- Chinese: 梁思永
Transcriptions
Standard Mandarin
- Hanyu Pinyin: Liáng Sīyǒng
- Wade–Giles: Liang^{2} Ssu^{1}-yung^{3}

Liang Siyong (Chinese: 梁思永; Wade–Giles: Liang Ssu-yung; 13 November 1904 – 2 April 1954) was a Chinese anthropologist and archaeologist. He was deputy director of the Institute of Archaeology at the Chinese Academy of Sciences. One of the first scholars to introduce the discipline of archaeology to China, Liang is regarded as one of China's "first-generation archaeologists". He was the second son of the scholar Liang Qichao. Liang was married to Li Fuman, with whom he had one daughter. He died of a heart attack on 2 April 1954, at the age of 49.

== Life and career ==
Liang was born on 13 November 1904 in Macau, the fourth child and second son of journalist and scholar Liang Qichao. He had eight siblings – four brothers (Sicheng, Sizhong, Sida, and Sili) and four sisters (Sishun, Sizhuang, Siyi, and Sining). He completed his primary education in Yokohama, where his family had been exiled to, and graduated from Tsinghua University in 1924. He then enrolled at Harvard University, where he studied archaeology and picked up English. At the time, the archaeology field in China was virtually nonexistent, thus Liang is considered as one of the "first-generation archaeologists" who introduced the discipline to the country.

In 1930 he began research at the Yingjin River and was the first Chinese to publish a survey on it. Likewise, in 1931, he performed what is thought to be "one of China's first scientific excavations" at Qiqihar, which led to the unearthing of artefacts thousands of years old. In January of that year, Liang wed his cousin Li Fuman (李福曼). Three years Liang's junior, Li was also a Tsinghua graduate. Liang's line of work was strenuous and often he had to "spend hours in the water" for field work, while having to forgo proper meals too. Praised for his disciplined work ethic, Liang was known for not letting discomfort or illness hinder his job. This, however, was not without its consequences; in 1932, Liang fell ill in the wilderness but refused to seek medical help until he ran an unbearably high fever. It was later found out that he had serious respiratory infection.

Liang published a comprehensive report on the Chengziya site of the Longshan culture in 1934, titled Chengziya site excavation report (城子崖遺址發掘報告), which is regarded as one of his more notable publications as an archaeologist. His excavation of a tomb at Hougang (后岗) in the same year, as part of a project which had begun in 1928, provided groundbreaking evidence of "large burials anywhere at Yinxu". Liang continued investigations at Yinxu till 1937, uncovering several other tombs, artefacts and worshipping structures dating back to the Shang dynasty. Liang was the first deputy director of the Institute of Archaeology of the Chinese Academy of Sciences, serving from 1948 until his death in 1954. He was succeeded by Yin Da.

== Death and legacy ==
While resuming the excavation of royal tombs at Anyang, Liang contracted tuberculosis. He died on 2 April 1954 in Beijing, at age 49; the cause of death was a heart attack. He had been working on a report on animal remains found at the Anyang site. He was survived by Li and his only child Liang Baiyou (梁柏有), who likened her father to Water Margin character Shi Xiu, in reference to his determination and tirelessness. An anthology of his anthropological papers, titled Papers on archaeology by Liang Siyong (梁思永考古论文集), was published in 1959. In his 2015 book In Manchuria: A Village Called Wasteland and the Transformation of Rural China, Michael Meyer writes of Liang with high esteem, underscoring his title of "father of Chinese archaeology", a label which had previously been reserved for Liang's peer Li Ji.

== Select publications ==
- Chengziya site excavation report (Chinese: 城子崖遺址發掘報告; 1934)
- Papers on archaeology by Liang Siyong (梁思永考古论文集; 1959) including:
  - (Report on Yingjin River) (1930)
  - New Age stone pottery from the prehistoric site at Hsi-yin Tsun, Shansi, China (1930)
  - Problems with Far Eastern archaeology (远东考古学上的若干问题)
  - Prehistorical sites at Ang'angxi (昂昂溪史前遗址)
  - Longshan — one of China's earliest cultures (龙山文化 — 中国文明的史前期之一)
  - New Age stone pottery and tools from Rehe (热河查不干庙等处所采集之新石器时代石器与陶片)
