= Zhao Mingcheng =

Chinese epigrapher, poet, and politician

- 赵明诚
- Born: 1081; Zhucheng, Shandong, Song dynasty
- Died: 1129 (aged 47–48); Hangzhou, Song dynasty
- Other names: Défǔ (德甫)
- Occupation(s): Epigrapher, poet, civil servant, antiquarian
- Notable work: Jīn Shí Lù [金石錄]
- Opponent: Cai Jing
- Spouse: Li Qingzhao

Zhao Mingcheng (Chinese: 赵明诚; pinyin: Zhào Míngchéng, courtesy name Défǔ (德甫) or Défù (德父) (1081–1129) was a Chinese epigrapher, poet, and politician of the Song dynasty, husband to the famous poet Li Qingzhao. His 30-volume magnum opus Jīn Shí Lù (金石錄) has long been hailed as an important work in the development of Chinese epigraphy since its publication.

== Biography ==
Zhao Mingcheng was born in Zhucheng, Shandong, in an affluent scholar-official family. He was the third son of civil servant Zhao Tingzhi (趙挺之), who served as a prime minister (尚書右仆射) during the reign of Song Huizong. Zhao spent most of his youth in the capital Bianjing (modern day Kaifeng), where he entered the royal Taixue academy to study the classics. In 1101 he met then 18-year-old Li Qingzhao and the two quickly fell in love. Their marriage was hailed among the literati. The couple shared strong interest in art collection and epigraphy and avowed to collect as many antiquities as possible for the sake of future research.

Zhao Mingcheng started his civil service career in 1103, but was quickly involved in an imperial court power struggle between his father and the infamous politician Cai Jing. In 1107 he was arrested and brought to court by his political rivals but his case was soon closed for lack of evidence. After this episode he returned to his hometown of Zhucheng and started to focus on his systematic study of antiquities.

Zhao assumed a series of local governmental jobs in different areas. After the Jingkang incident of the Jin–Song wars, worried by the approaching Jurchen army, the couple was forced to flee to the South and forsake most of their collection and research notes at Zhucheng. They started their journey to the South with 15 carts of their most cherished items and books. Most of the collection was lost during the chaotic voyage. Later the couple learned that their collection at Zhucheng was burned by the invaders, which was a devastating blow to Zhao and Li.

Zhao was appointed in late 1128 as the magistrate for Huzhou and decided to go by himself first, leaving Li to take care of their surviving collection. When asked by Li about how to handle their collection should there be another Jurchens attack, Zhao told her to "discard furniture, then clothes, then books and scrolls, then antiques" and to "carry the most treasured items with you" so "you can live or die with them together." He was infected with dysentery on his way to Huzhou and was forced to stay at a Hangzhou inn. When Li found him he was about to die. On September 3, 1129, Zhao asked for a writing brush to compose his last poem and subsequently died.

== Epigraphy studies ==
Zhao Mingcheng was fascinated by ancient art and artifacts in his early years, partly influenced by the academic interests of leading scholars such as Ouyang Xiu. Thanks to his family background, Zhao was able to visit the antique collections of famous intellectuals of that time. During his years in Kaifeng, Zhao often had to sell his personal belongings to support his own collection. After his release from prison, Zhao returned to Zhucheng. Zhao fully devoted himself to collecting art. He started to compose Jin Shi Lu with the help of his intellectual wife, Li Qingzhao. According to her account, the couple had to live a simple life to support their intellectual enterprise.

Zhao's most important scholarly achievement was Jin Shi Lu, in which he recorded the details of nearly 2,000 antique inscriptions, with carefully researched analysis about their histories. Since its publication, the book was highly regarded by literati as an important work. The intellectual leader of the Song dynasty Zhu Xi praised the book for its "well-organized structure, precise analysis and impressive bibliography" and spoke highly of its stylistic prose.

Zhao valued archaeological evidence over textual evidence. He stressed the importance of using ancient inscriptions to correct discrepancies and errors in later texts discussing details in ancient history, such as dates, geographical locations of historical events, genealogies, and official titles. He cast doubt on the reliability of historical works, because they were composed after the actual event. He stated that "...the inscriptions on stone and bronze are made at the time the events took place and can be trusted without reservation, and thus discrepancies may be discovered." Historian R.C. Rudolph argues that Zhao's emphasis on consulting contemporary sources for accurate dating is parallel with the concern of the German historian Leopold von Ranke (1795–1886).

Zhao applied a critical methodology in his research. He scrutinized epigraphy scholarship of his time and corrected many mistakes and textual errors of received texts (texts passed down through the generations). His Jin Shi Lu also preserved many important historical records.

Zhao, however, died before the publication of Jin Shi Lu. His wife Li Qingzhao proofread and edited his surviving manuscripts and finished the book, which was finally published in 1132. Li Qingzhao wrote an essay recalling the couple's effort in the composition of Jin Shi Lu, which was published with the book. The essay (金石錄後序) is best known for its nostalgic recollection of the couples' life struggle with intense pathos.
