= Xia Nai =

Chinese archaeologist (1910–1985)

Xia Nai FBA
- 夏鼐
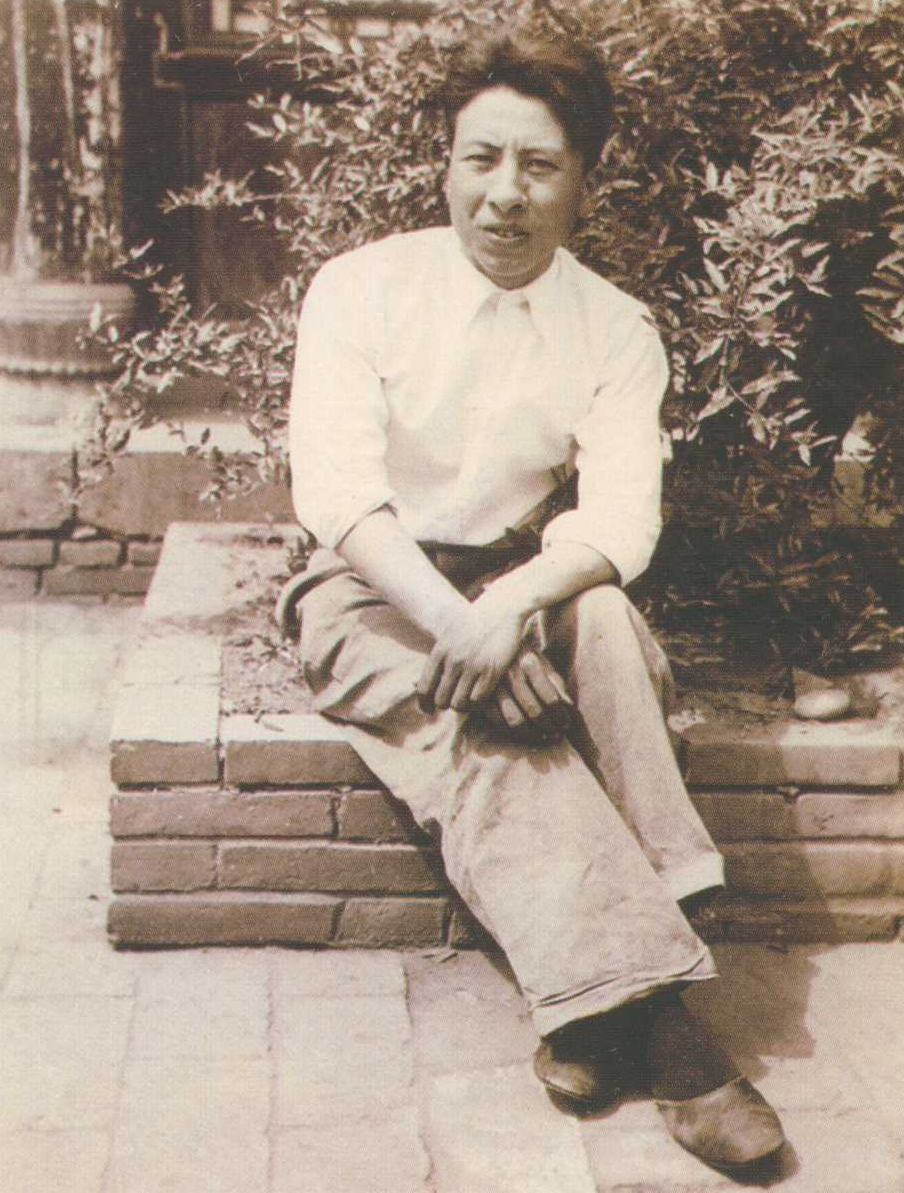
- Xia Nai in 1935
- Born: 1910; Wenzhou, Zhejiang, China
- Died: 1985 (aged 74–75)
- Occupations: Archaeologist, professor, social scientist

Academic background
- Education: Tsinghua University; University College London
- Academic advisor: Li Ji

Academic work
- Discipline: Archaeology, Egyptology, economic history, social science
- Sub-discipline: Archaeology of China, Chinese history
- Institutions: Central Museum; Academia Sinica; Zhejiang University; Chinese Academy of Sciences: Institute of Archaeology; Chinese Academy of Social Sciences

Xia Nai
- Chinese: 夏鼐
Transcriptions
Standard Mandarin
- Hanyu Pinyin: Xià Nài
- Wade–Giles: Shiah Nae

Xia Nai (Wade–Giles: Shiah Nae; 1910–1985) was a pioneering Chinese archaeologist. He was born in Wenzhou, southern Zhejiang province. He was the second son of Xia Yuyi (夏禹彝) who was a wealthy farmer. Xia was given the first name of Guodong (國棟) but later requested to be named Nai (鼐) and styled himself as Ming (铭) when he became an intellectual upon secondary education. He majored in Economic History at Tsinghua University in Beijing (BA, 1934), winning a scholarship to study abroad. On advice from his mentor Li Ji, he went to University College London and studied Egyptology, earning a doctorate that was finally awarded to him in 1946. In the meantime, he had returned to China joining the staff of the Central Museum and then in 1944 joining the Department of Archaeology of the Institute of History and Philology, Academia Sinica (1943–49), becoming acting director in 1948. When the Institute moved to Taiwan in 1949, Xia remained in the mainland, teaching at Zhejiang University for a year before joining the Chinese Academy of Sciences, eventually becoming director of its Institute of Archaeology (1962–82). Before his death, he was First Vice President of the Chinese Academy of Social Sciences (CASS).

When the Cultural Revolution was launched in 1966, Xia was persecuted and suffered public humiliation and hard labor. In 1970, he was sent to May Seventh Cadre School along with other archaeologists, where they had "re-education." Due to a commission, the Institute received from Albania, in 1972, Xia returned to Beijing with his colleagues and resurrected his scholarly career.

Thanks to his contributions to Chinese and world archaeology, Xia was one of the most honoured Chinese scholars in academe, receiving memberships from the British Academy, the German Archaeological Institute, the Swedish Royal Academy of Letters, History and Antiquities, the U.S. Academy of Sciences, the Third World Academy of Sciences, The International Association for Mediterranean and Oriental Studies, etc., among others.

== Early life ==
Despite being born during unstable times (Imperial Qing China was devastated and was overthrown by the Xinhai revolution in 1911), Xia's family was rather wealthy and Xia did not have to worry about basic needs unlike many of his contemporaries at the time. He attended sishu (私塾), primary school and secondary school in his hometown of Wenzhou and went to Shanghai in 1927 to attend high school. He attended Yenching University after his high school graduation in 1930 and transferred to Tsinghua University the following year. Xia studied economic history and was awarded the Bachelor of Arts in 1934 and earned a scholarship to study abroad. According to local practices, students had to practice in an internship before studying abroad, so Xia joined Liang Siyong's (梁思永) excavation project of the northwestern royal mass grave of the Shang dynasty in 1935 Although Leung suggested Xia study archaeology under V. Gordon Childe at the University of Edinburgh, he believed that it would be better for Xia to learn the basics in London.

== Studies in the United Kingdom ==
Xia left for his studies at University College London in June 1935 and arrived in the United Kingdom in September later that year. By the time of his studies, Flinders Petrie had already retired from the university and it was Mortimer Wheeler who was heading the Institute of Archaeology and the archaeology course at University College London. Xia learned Ancient Egyptian hieroglyphics under professor Stephen Glanville. While many of his professors were well established and knowledgeable, Xia criticized Walter Perceval Yetts, one of his professors in archeology for his incompetence in both Chinese and archaeology, and challenged his ironic role in heading the department of Chinese Art and Archaeology at London University. He pointed out how Yetts could not read Chinese when a student raised a question during a lecture and how he struggled to comprehend dynastic jargon when analyzing the authenticity of an original record by the Qing imperial court kept in the British Museum. Xia accumulated a handful of field experience in archaeology by participating in Wheeler's excavation at Maiden Castle in Dorset in July 1936 and returned to London in September later that year. He also participated in the British's excavation project in Armant, Egypt and Tell Duweir, Palestine. Xia visited Petrie during his time in Palestine as the latter was recovering in a hospital in Jerusalem. Despite being far away from home, he always kept himself updated on China's ever-changing situation through reading the newspaper and having conversations with fellow Chinese students studying abroad. Due to the outbreak of the Second World War, Xia left for home in 1939. However, Xia spent a year conducting Egyptology research at the Cairo Museum for almost a year and only arrived at Kunming, China in 1941.

== Egyptian bead collection ==
William Flinders Petrie put together a collection of ancient Egyptian beads after his excavations in Egypt but was never able to fully assess the collection, yet he stated that 'beads with pottery constitute the alphabet of archaeological research', emphasizing the potential benefits of studying the beads. Inspired by Petrie, Xia decided to conduct the organization and assessment of the ancient Egyptian beads collection (Petrie Collection) as his doctoral dissertation under the supervision of Stephen Glanville.

This project consists of 1760 index cards, with each including the registration number, provenance, date, use, reference, remarks, drawing and photograph number of the corresponding string of beads. The significance of Xia's index cards was its clarity, straightforwardness and credibility granted by the inclusion of both an index and a bibliography. Therefore, it was believed that these cards were intentionally made for future research purposes, as his notes allowed both himself and modern scholars to easily comprehend his findings. Xia's research discussed the material, typology (including the technical peculiarities), use, arrangement and pictorial representation of the beads in relation to the nine divisions of the Ancient Egyptian dynasties. Hence, his research illuminated the characteristics of each of the periods, the general development from dynasty to dynasty, and ancient Egypt's contact with foreign countries. His assessment of the beads also corrected many mistakes regarding the dating and material by Petrie. For instance, some beads were classified as being made out of the same material since they looked similar or some strings would be dated based on the dating of the tomb from which it was recovered instead of the actual dating of the beads themselves. Xia also proposed a new method to categorize the beads thus coming up with the first-ever comprehensive bead corpus to have included ancient Egyptian beads from all periods dated before the Arab conquest of Egypt. He came up with a classification method that is based on the 'group of material' which subdivided into two groups of 'decorated' and 'undecorated'. He justified that his classification method was both scientific and systematic after evaluating the pros and cons of other pre-existing beads classification methods by Horace C. Beck, George Reisner, Guy Brunton and Hermann Junker.

Despite the importance of Xia's findings to the study of Egyptology, his work was not published until 2014, 71 years after the completion of the research. Furthermore, he did receive what he deserved for his contributions to Egyptology. There are a few reasons why his name to be relatively unknown in the field of Egyptology: his own halt in Egyptological research, the outbreak of the Second World War, the undesirable political situation in New China, and potentially European exclusionist of oriental scholars.

After his return to China in 1941 and the completion of his assessment of the ancient Egyptian beads in 1943, Xia did not further research the study of Egyptology. It was not clear whether he had lost interest in the subject or whether he was too preoccupied with Chinese archeological work due to his positions in the respective academies. However, it should be pointed out that Xia has always been devoted to Chinese archaeology and he originally intended to pursue archaeology instead of Egyptology.

The outbreak of the Second World War also briefly halted his research as the University College London was closed and he had to return to China. Fortunately, his submission of his thesis in 1943 earned him a doctorate degree in Egyptian archeology in 1946 without the need of defending. Similarly, the tense political situation in China prevented Xia from conducting Egyptological research. Especially during the Cultural Revolution in 1966, Xia's participation in any foreign-related studies could get him into trouble. Yet, he was still persecuted by the Communist Party even though he entirely focused on Chinese archaeology since 1943 (which will be discussed in the next section), preventing him from potentially continuing the study of Egyptology out of self-protection.

The proposition of the possibility of Europeans excluding oriental scholars is based on the fact that numerous non-European scholars have been excluded in the study of Egyptology. It was not until Donald Reid published his book Whose Pharaohs? Archaeology, Museums, and Egyptian National Identity from Napoleon to World War I that he questioned why the roles of Egyptians are not as prominent as European scholars. It could also be due to the impacts of the Cold War in which China was on the opposition bloc of the capitalist bloc. Hence it would not be a surprise for westerners to undermine an individual 'communist enemy'. No matter what, the fact that Xia's efforts were not officially recognized with publication until 71 years later holds true and it would be nearly impossible to understand the exact reasons for this to have happened since Xia has passed away.

== Return to China ==
Xia joined the staff of the Central Museum upon his return to China. He joined the subsequently formed Department of Archeology of the Institute of History and Philology, Academia Sinica (1943–49) and became the director in 1948. He chose to stay in China when the institution moved to Taiwan in 1949, anticipating the defeat of the Kuomintang by the Chinese Communist Party (CCP) in the Chinese Civil War. He briefly went back to his home province to teach at the Zhejiang University. In 1950, he was appointed associate dean at the newly established Chinese Academy of Sciences and headed field archeological projects. Later in the same year, he led his first excavation in the Henan province, which discovered artifacts from the Shang dynasty. Xia was keen on passing on his excavation skills and techniques to his students as he once taught them that the success of an archeologist is not determined by what he or she manages to discover but the method of how he or she recovers artifacts. Xia was appointed the dean of the academy in 1962 following the deaths of Liang Siyong and Zheng Zhenduo (original dean of the academy).

He joined the CCP in 1959 and was elected as a deputy to the second to sixth National People's Congress. Apart from actively heading archeological excavations, Xia also started publishing the first Chinese archeological journals, Kaogu and Kaogu Tongxun in 1966 and had taken up the position of editor in chief. Publications of both journals were paused in 1966 due to the Cultural Revolution but publications were fortunately resumed in 1972 under the approval of General Secretary Zhou Enlai. Despite his dedication and devotion to Chinese archaeology and China, he together with many of his colleagues and students were categorized as 'capitalist roaders', 'rightists' and 'Cow demons and snake spirits' who were obstructing the goal of the revolution in eradicating social classes. Hence, throughout the Cultural Revolution (until 1972), Xia was paraded with the others in public and had his belongings such as his diaries confiscated by the Red Guards. During the time, even his undergraduate dissertation was used against him as it included pro-nationalist (the Kuomintang) contents (which Xia noted that he was forced by Chiang to do so back then in his diary). He was then sent to a 'cow shed' (牛棚), the term for re-education camps established during the Cultural Revolution that were targeted at intellectuals, in Beijing. He was also forced to attend the May Seventh Cadre School, which aimed to 're-educate' students about the greatness of Mao Zedong.

He was finally released in 1971 upon being deemed 'fit' by authorities and resumed his archaeological work. With China's improving relations with the West as a result of the Sino-Soviet split, Xia was able to attend foreign conferences and receive foreign academics. The Albanians' visit in 1971 to repair historical books as well as the Japanese's visit in the same year for academic exchanging purposes were among the myriad of opportunities that he took part in. Xia edited numerous Chinese archaeological publications including the Report of the Excavation in the Hui District (輝縣發掘報告) and the Report of the Excavation in Changsha (長沙發掘報告) before the Cultural Revolution. However, one of his most important contributions to Chinese archaeological publications was his role as editor in chief to the Archaeological Volume of the Chinese Encyclopedia (中國大百科全書·考古學卷), which included the full record of archeological findings and discoveries in China dating back to the Stone Age up until the Ming dynasty. Xia later became the First President of the Chinese Academy of Social Sciences (CASS) in 1982. Xia also contributed greatly to the preservation of Chinese artifacts by advising the drafting of the Cultural Relics Protection Law, pointing out the section of 'Relics Trade' should be discarded as it directly contradicts the law's intention to protect relics.

The opening up of China in the 1970s allowed Xia to reunite with his teachers and conduct exchanges with fellow foreign scholars. Xia's contributions to the field of archaeology were finally recognized internationally and were acknowledged by esteemed institutions. He received eleven memberships throughout 1974–85 from the British Academy, the German Archaeological Institute, the Swedish Royal Academy of Letters, History and Antiquities, the U.S. Academy of Sciences, the Third World Academy of Sciences, The International Association for Mediterranean and Oriental Studies etc.

== Xia and the development of Egyptology in China ==
Xia was the first Chinese doctorate to study Egyptology. While there might have been others such as Guo Songtao, a diplomat of the Qing Empire who had travelled to Egypt or Duanfang, a scholar who collected tracings of Egyptian stela, neither of them truly understood or developed the technique to conduct a thorough excavation as Xia since they did not intend to study Egyptology properly. Xia brought back his knowledge in Egyptology and archaeology from his time studying in the United Kingdom to assist his archaeological work in China. Although he is regarded as the first legit Chinese 'Egyptologist', he gave up entirely on Egyptological research upon the submission of his doctoral thesis in 1943, and hence there was an interruption to the development of Egyptology in China. Xia's published article—'A Chinese Parallel to an Egyptian Idiom'—which pointed out the similarity between how Chinese and ancient Egyptians drew connections between 'youth' and the 'smell of the mouth after drinking human milk'. Xia is also considered to be the 'first wave' (and the only one from this generation) of Chinese Egyptological researchers whose importance lies in his ability to set himself as a pioneer of the Egyptological field. He serves as an inspiration for future generations and reminds them of the importance of the Chinese perspective in contribution to 'a new understanding' of ancient Egypt.
