= Xu Xusheng =

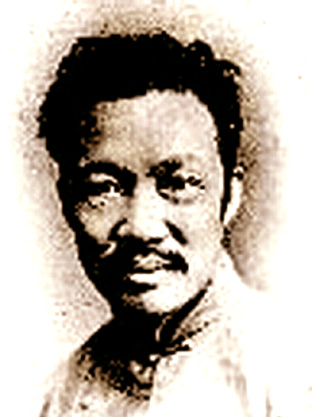
- Xu Xusheng photographed at Beijing University in 1920
- Chinese: 徐旭生
Transcriptions
Standard Mandarin
- Hanyu Pinyin: Xú Xùshēng
- Wade–Giles: Hsü^{2} Hsü^{4}-sheng^{1}
- IPA: [ɕy̌ ɕŷʂə́ŋ]

Alternative Chinese name
- Chinese: 徐炳昶
Transcriptions
Standard Mandarin
- Hanyu Pinyin: Xú Bǐngchǎng
- Wade–Giles: Hsü^{2} Ping^{3}-ch'ang^{3}
- IPA: [ɕy̌ pìŋʈʂʰàŋ]

Xu Xusheng, also known by his courtesy name Xu Bingchang, (1888 – January 4, 1976) was a Chinese archaeologist, historian, and explorer born in Tanghe, Henan Province. Best known for his discovery of the Erlitou culture in 1959, he was one of China's most important and respected archaeologists and historians of the twentieth century, providing a model of archaeological methodology for future Chinese archaeologists. He also was president of Beijing Normal University.

== Biography ==
In 1921, Xu was appointed professor in the department of philosophy, Peking University, teaching History of Western Philosophy. In 1926, he served as provost of Peking University, and in the following year he led an expedition to northwest China to conduct archaeological investigations. In 1929, Xu served as dean of National Peking University Women's Teachers College. He also was president of Beijing Normal University from February 1931 to May 1932. He traveled to Xi'an in 1933, where he established the Shaanxi Archaeological Society. From 1934 to 1937 he investigated the Early Neolithic culture in Shaanxi Province, discovered by his team of archaeologists who carried out excavations at the Doujitai site in the middle Yellow River Valley, where his approach was said to have served as a model for archaeological methodology. He became director of the Institute for Historical Studies in 1936.

Xu was instrumental in conducting the first modern study of China's early "myths" based on the reports of antiquaries findings by archaeologists. He also worked on the Historical Gazetteer of Beiping.

He was elected to the Chinese National Assembly in 1947. Xu became a research fellow of the Institute of Archaeology of the Chinese Academy of Sciences, and surveyed Gaocheng in 1959. The Erlitou culture was discovered by him that year. He joined the Chinese Communist Party in 1957, and was elected to the Third National People's Congress in 1964. Persecuted during the Cultural Revolution, Xu died during January 1976.

== Research ==
As a historian, Xu authored the 1943 book, Zhongguo gushi de chuanshuo shidai ("The legendary times in early Chinese history"), where he comments that the name of Five Emperors was not mentioned until the Warring States era and cannot be found in earlier works such as the Zuo Zhuan, Guoyu, Lunyu, Mozi or Mencius. This was the first book to provide detailed facts concerning ancient Chinese history and archaeological finds and present a comprehensive history of China's prehistoric period.
