= Li Ji (archaeologist) =

Chinese archaeologist

- 李濟
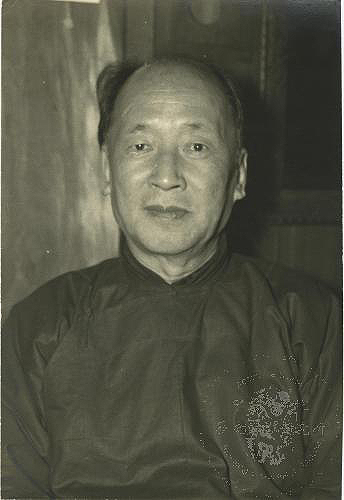
- Li Ji (ca 1940)
- Born: July 12, 1896; Zhongxiang, Hubei, Qing dynasty
- Died: August 1, 1979 (aged 83); Taipei, Taiwan
- Occupations: Archaeologist, professor
- Known for: Modern Chinese archaeology

Academic background
- Education: Tsinghua University (BS); Clark University (BA, MA); Harvard University (PhD)
- Thesis: The Formation of the Chinese People: an Anthropological Inquiry (1928)
- Influences: Alfred Tozzer, Roland Burrage Dixon, Earnest Hooton

Academic work
- Discipline: Archaeology, anthropology, sociology, psychology
- Sub-discipline: Chinese prehistory, Ancient Chinese history, archaeology of the Shang dynasty
- Institutions: Nankai University; Tsinghua University; Freer Gallery of Art; Academia Sinica; National Taiwan University
- Notable students: Xia Nai, Kwang-chih Chang

Li Ji (Chinese: 李濟; July 12, 1896 – August 1, 1979), also commonly romanized as Li Chi, was an influential Chinese archaeologist. He is considered to be one of the foremost figures in modern Chinese archaeology and his work was instrumental in proving the historical authenticity of the Shang dynasty.

== Biography ==
Li Ji came from a wealthy family of Hubei province, where, in 1896, he was born in the city of Zhongxiang. After his graduation from the Tsinghua University in Beijing he moved to the United States in 1918 to study psychology at Clark University in Worcester, Massachusetts. After he had earned a BA in psychology and a MA in sociology at Clark, he moved on to Harvard University to study anthropology. There he studied in particular with Alfred Tozzer (archeology), Roland Burrage Dixon (anthropology) and Earnest Hooton (anthropology) and was awarded a PhD in 1923. His dissertation was later published by Harvard University Press under the title The Formation of the Chinese People: an Anthropological Inquiry (1928). Li Ji returned to China and began teaching anthropology and sociology at Nankai University and later at Tsinghua University. In 1925 and 1926 he conducted archeological excavations of the Yangshao culture in the southern part of the Shanxi province, for which he was invited to join the Freer Gallery of Art in Washington D.C. as a field worker. In 1928 he became the first director of the archeology department of the Academica Sinica while continuing to work for the Freer Gallery.

Li led the excavations at Yinxu near Anyang from 1928 to 1937 until the outbreak of the Second Sino-Japanese War prevented further work. Regarded as the first set of archaeological excavations following modern archaeological principles in China, these excavations yielded the discovery of a royal palace and over 300 graves, including 4 royal ones. The recovered artefacts comprised among others early bronze casts and a large number of oracle bones, which represent the earliest significant body of ancient Chinese writing. Those findings finally established historical authenticity of the Shang dynasty, which had still been a subject of debate up to that point.

After the war Li fled to Taiwan when the communist forces under Mao Zedong took power in mainland China. There he became the head of the archeology and anthropology departments of the National Taiwan University in Taipei. He died on August 1 of 1979 in Taipei.

During his career Li mentored a generation of Chinese archaeologists including Xia Nai, Kwang-chih Chang, and Guo Baojun.

== Influence ==
=== Chinese Modern Archaeology ===
In 1929, the excavation of Yinxu personally presided over by Li Ji did not focus on finding oracle bones, but pottery, animal bones, and bronzes were given equal attention as specimens. When working in the field, use the digging method to excavate. During the excavation in the second half of 1929, Li Ji also asked Zhang Weiran to measure a more detailed topographic map of the Yinxu. All of this shows that the excavators attached great importance to the spatial location of the unearthed objects. However, in the excavation of strata, Li Ji followed his horizontal stratum excavation method in Xiyin Village, Xia County. It marked that the excavation of Yinxu in 1929 completely broke away from the category of epigraphy and began to truly move towards the road of modern field archaeology.

And this layering method promoted the excavation of Yinxu. In 1931, the excavation of the Hougang of Yinxu revealed that the three cultural layers of Xiaotun, Longshan and Yangshao were superimposed and accumulated, and confirmed the sequence of ancient Chinese cultural evolution.

=== Yinxu and the origin of Chinese culture ===
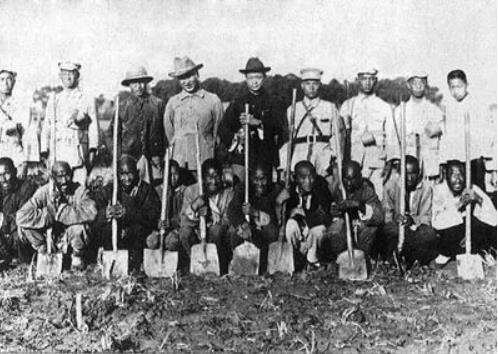

The exploration of the cultural origin of Yinxu and the reconstruction of ancient history, the former is an archaeological problem, and the latter is a historical problem, but the two are interrelated. The exploration of the cultural origin of Yinxu is the basis for the reconstruction of ancient history. At the beginning of the excavation of Yinxu, the excavators paid attention to the origin of Yinxu culture. During the third excavation of Yinxu in 1929, Li Ji discussed the pioneers of the "Xiaotun Culture" based on a piece of painted pottery unearthed in the strata.

=== Li Ji's Views on Archaeology ===
Although Li Ji presided over the excavation of Yinxu in order to find the origin of Chinese civilization and refuted Andersson's statement about Chinese culture, he was always vigilant that he could not fall into the myth of nationalism. He criticized the "cultural centralism" prejudice of Western sinologists, and needed to pay attention to the uniqueness of Eastern civilization. On the other hand, he also criticized the limitations of Chinese scholars and paid too much attention to cultural exchanges in East Asia and surrounding areas.

== Works ==
- 1928: The Formation of the Chinese People: an Anthropological Inquiry
- 1932: Manchuria in History: a summary
- 1957: The Beginnings of Chinese Civilization
- 1977: Anyang
