= Issa Hanna Dabish =

Iraqi artist and conservator-restorer

- عيسى حنا
- Born: 1919; Tel Keppe, Iraq
- Died: 2006 (aged 86–87); Canada
- Known for: Painting, Restoration of antiquities
- Movement: Abstract art

Issa Hanna Dabish (1919-2006), simply known as Issa Hanna, was an Iraqi artist and restorer of antiquities, noted for silkscreen works. Along with Akram Sukri, he was instrumental in founding Iraq's first modern art association in 1941.

== Life and career ==
Issa Hanna Dabish was born in Tel Keppe, an Assyrian town in northern Iraq, in 1919. At around the age of five or six, the young Issa Hanna, emigrated to Baghdad with his family after locusts ravaged the family's crops.

In an interview with the Multicultural Review, he described his early childhood in Telkaif and Baghdad:

From the age of five or six years old, I did sculpture from mud while living in Telkaif, a village in northern Iraq. At six we moved to Baghdad and I started drawing. When my family gave me four floos (pennies) to spend in school, I would hide the money and then buy a box of watercolors. Sometimes my mother would catch me, and say, “Oh, he’s sketching again!” My parents wanted me to be an engineer or a doctor.

He received his early education at Rawdat Al-Chaldan and Al-Ma'muniya Primary School. He attended the Jaafari secondary school at the same time as he was teaching painting at the Eastern Middle School. His early art education was at the Institute of Fine Arts in Baghdad where he graduated in 1950 and later studied abroad at Syracuse University New York graduating in 1956.

He showed an early talent for drawing. At the age of 12, he was making portraits of well-known local figures in chalk, pen and ink. Although his parents encouraged his painting as a hobby, he often felt the need to conceal his artistic endeavours for fear of being reprimanded. However, two of his teachers, artists, Nasser Awni and Qasim Naji, noticed his ability and encouraged him. Professor Nasser Awni found a special room for gifted artists and he was allocated a place there. In his final year, he completed a portrait of King Faisal, which was displayed in the Boy Scouts Square at the annual Boy Scouts Festival.

He was on good terms with the Selim family, whose members were all notable artists in their own right, and he was a similar age to two of the sons, Su'ad Salim and Jawad Selim. During visits to the Salim home, he was able to observe their collection of paintings by Iraqi pioneer artists including; Abdul Qadir Al Rassam, Asim Hafidh and Mohammed Saleh Zaki, and was also given access to art books that were in print at the time. Through the Selims, he was introduced to prominent artists, Zaid Mohammed Saleh Zaki, Atta Sabri and Hafidh al-Droubi, who was teaching at the Art Institute. Al-Droubi, who was known for encouraging talented young artists, was very pleased with Issa Hanna's work.

Al-Droubi and his contemporaries, adopted the young Issa Hanna into their group and expanded his art education by teaching him different types of drawing, and to use a variety of media such as oils, pastels and watercolours. Initially they encouraged him to paint Baghdad's streetscapes and alleyways, but later they also took him on trips outside Baghdad to paint landscapes.

He enrolled at the Institute of Fine Arts in Baghdad, graduating in 1950 and later studied at Syracuse University in New York, graduating in 1956 where he majored in photography and commercial art. He subsequently became the first Iraqi to teach silkscreen technique.

After completing his education, he worked for the Water Board, but later joined the Department of Antiquities, where he met the artist, Akram Shukri, who was the Director of the Antiquities’ Laboratory. Together with Akram Shukri, he was instrumental in forming the Society of Artists and Art Lovers, founded in 1941.

He remained very active in Iraq's arts community throughout his life. He served on the inaugural board of the Society for Artists and Art Lovers, formed in 1941, as its treasurer. He was a founding member of the Primitive Artists Group in 1950, and also a foundation member of Iraqi Plastic Artists’ Society, formed in 1956. He was appointed the lifetime honorary chairman of the Iraqi Artists Association. He was also the chairman of the International Chaldean Artists’ Association.

In 1993, he emigrated to Canada to be with his son. In spite of his advanced age, he continued to paint, producing smaller works in pastels and aquarelle. He also taught painting to senior citizens and children out of a local gallery. He died in 2009, aged 90 years.

== Work ==
Throughout his career, Issan Hanna focused on the practice of painting. He was not drawn to theories of contemporary art. Nature is the dominant theme in his paintings.

He painted in the abstract style.

Some 20 works were housed in the Iraqi Center for the Arts (formerly the Saddam Center for the Arts), prior to the lootings of 2003. Twelve of these works have since been recovered are now on display at the Baghdad Museum of Modern Art.

== See also ==
- Iraqi art
- Conservation and restoration of cultural heritage
