= Adam Shukri =

Akram Shukri
- اكرم شكري
- Born: 1910; Baghdad, Iraq
- Died: 1983; Baghdad, Iraq
- Education: Slade School, London (1931-36)
- Known for: Painting; Restoration of archaeological artefacts
- Movement: Impressionism; Pointillism

Akram Shukri (Arabic: اكرم شكري; 1910–1983) was an Iraqi artist and architect. He was the first Iraqi artist to receive an art scholarship to study in England and was also the first Iraqi artist to paint using the Pointillism style. He was instrumental in founding the Society of Artists and Art Lovers in 1941, an art group that shaped Iraq's attitudes to the arts and the role of the arts in the construction of a national identity for the newly created Iraqi state. He worked for the Iraqi Department of Antiquities and Heritage, and in his later career, became the director of the Iraqi Antiquities Laboratory.

== Life and career ==
Akram Shukri (alternatively Akram Shoukry) was born in Baghdad in 1910 and grew up in the Hasan Pasha district.

During his secondary schooling, his teacher Shaukat Al-Khafaf encouraged him to study painting and become a professional artist. He initially studied fine arts in Baghdad.

In 1931, King Faisal began offering art scholarships to Iraqi artists for the purpose of studying abroad. Akram Shukri was the first Iraqi to receive such a scholarship. He studied painting at the Slade School in London, graduating in 1936.

When Shukri and the first wave of artists returned from their art studies, they became a source of national pride and their artworks, which developed a distinct local character, served as symbols of a new national identity. Shukri, along with his contemporaries, Faeq Hassan, Jawad Saleem and others were household names in 1940s’ Baghdad.

Almost as soon as he returned to Baghdad, he conceived the idea of an arts society to promote the arts to the general public. He and a group of artists played around with the idea for several years, and eventually formed what became the Society of Artists and Art Lovers, Iraq's first art group, established in 1941. The inaugural Administrative Board consisted of Akram Shoukry (secretary), Su'ad Salim (joint secretary), Issa Hanna (treasurer) with Atta Sabri and Jawad Saleem as board members.

He participated in its exhibitions held for successive years.

He was an active participant in Iraq's arts community; becoming a member of the Iraqi Fine Artists Association and regularly displayed his work at the association's annual exhibitions.

Between 1936 and 1963, he was employed at the Department of Antiquities and Heritage, where he restored important archaeological specimens and earned a reputation as a skilful restorer. As part of his role with the Antiquities Department, he contributed articles, in Arabic, to the journal Sumer, the official publication of the Antiquities Department. In his later career, he served as the director of the Iraqi Antiquities Laboratory.

In 1959, he was awarded a UNESCO scholarship to travel to Mexico and the US to investigate restoration projects. In the US, he was very much influenced by the American artist Jackson Pollock.

== Work ==
He worked in oils, pastels, watercolours and also produced fresco works. In his early career, he painted traditional scenes and landscapes in a Realist style and also in an Impressionist style. However, after travelling to Mexico and the US in the late 1950s, he began painting in the Pointillism style (using small coloured dots or contiguous spots of colour). He was the first Iraqi artist to employ Pointillism, and he was responsible for introducing the style to his country. He also experimented with Assyrian and Babylonian motifs in his painting.

Shukri's most important creative works include: • Haidar Khanh • Alleys • Shanashanil • Wood in Mosul • Kufa Mosque • Narrow rails • Tigris at night • Milk seller • Gypsy wedding • Ghazala

== See also ==
- Conservation and restoration of archaeological sites
- Islamic art
- Iraqi art
- List of Iraqi artists
