= Orders, decorations, and medals of Iraq =

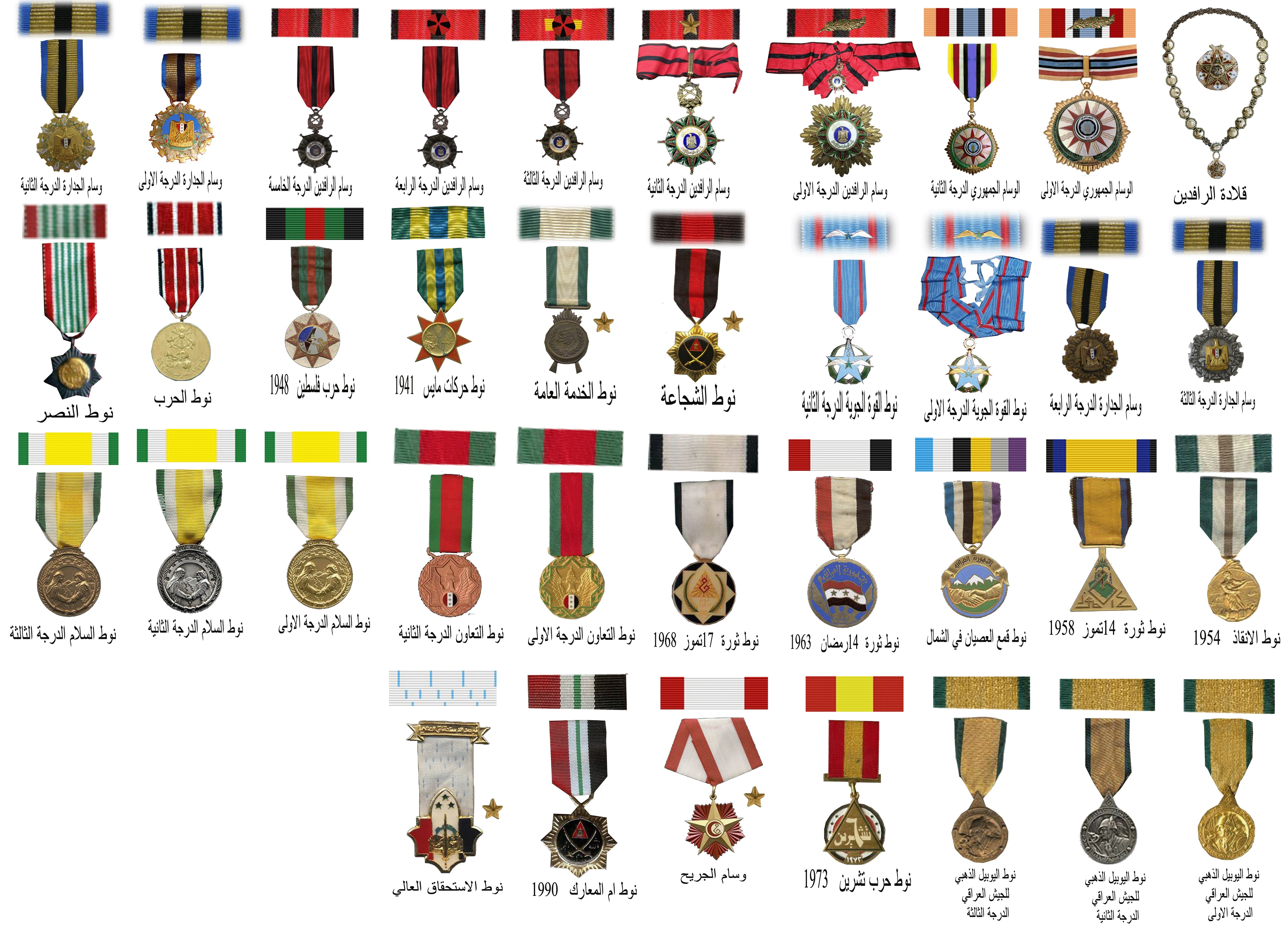
Medals in the Iraqi honours system.

The following is a list of Orders, decorations, and medals of Iraq throughout history.

== Orders ==
=== Kingdom of Iraq ===
- Hashemite Order
- Order of King Faisal I
- Order of the Two Rivers

=== Republic of Iraq (First Republic and Ba'athist Iraq) ===
- Order of the Republic (Iraq) (1958–1974)
- Order of the Two Rivers
- Order of Abd al-Karim Qasim (1958–1961)

== Military Medals ==
=== Kingdom of Iraq ===
- Police Distinguished Service Medal
- 1939-45 War Medal
- Medal for the May 1941 Revolt
- Victory Medal 1945
- Medal for the Palestine War 1948-49
- Iraqi Army Flood Rescue Medal
- General Service Medal
- Police General Service Medal
- King Faisal II Coronation Medal 1953

=== Republic of Iraq (First Republic and Ba'athist Iraq) ===
- Medal of Bravery
- Wounded Medal
- Mother of All Battles Medal
- Supreme Worthiness Medal
- Medal of Work
- Police Distinguished Service Medal
- Medal of Revolution of 14 July
- Medal for Crushing of Northern Rebellion
- Medal of Revolution of 14 Ramadan
- Medal for 18 November 1963
- Medal of Cooperation
- Medal for 17 July 1968 Revolution
- Medal for Peace
- Medal for the Golden Jubilee of the Iraqi Army 1921-71
- Medal for Arab-Israeli War 1973
- Medal for the War Against Iran, 1980-88
- Martyr's Medal for Widows

=== 2003-Present ===
- Iraq Commitment Medal
