= An Jiayao =

Chinese archaeologist

An Jiayao 安家瑶
- Occupations: Archaeologist, professor, archaeological site conservator, field researcher

Academic background
- Education: Chinese Academy of Social Sciences (CASS)

Academic work
- Discipline: Archaeology, conservation of cultural heritage
- Sub-discipline: The history of glass, Ancient Chinese glass, Asian history, field archaeology, cultural resources management, conservation and restoration of archaeological sites
- Institutions: Institute of Archaeology of the CASS, Central Research Institute of Culture and History, State Administration of Cultural Heritage
- Main interests: The ancient glass trade in China, Central Asia, and the Near East, Buddhist temples of the Sui and Tang dynasties, Taiye Lake

The family name is An.

An Jiayao is a Chinese archaeologist and the director the Xi’an Research Program and the Han & Tang Research Program of the Archaeology Research Institute under the Chinese Academy of Social Sciences (CASS). She is a specialist in the ancient glass of China, Central Asia, and the Near East and has additional interests in Sui and Tang dynasty Buddhist temples, the Taiye Lake ruins at the Tang dynasty Da Ming Palace, and the preservation and exhibition of archaeological sites. She received her MA in 1982 from Archaeology Department of CASS and has been involved in numerous excavations. From 2001 to 2005, she led an excavation at the imperial gardens at Daming Palace's Taiye Pond in a joint project between CASS's Institute of Archaeology and Japan's Nara National Research Institute for Cultural Properties. In 2014, she received a letter of appointment to membership in the Central Research Institute of Culture and History from Premier Li Keqiang. As deputy leader of the World Heritage Expert Group at the State Administration of Cultural Heritage, she also helped submit applications to UNESCO for the Anyang Yin Ruins, the West Lake in Hangzhou, and the Site of Xanaduto to become World Heritage Sites.

== Bibliography ==
- Jiayao, An, James C. Y. Watt, Angela F. Howard, Boris I. Marshak, Su Bai, and Zhao Feng, with contributions by Prudence O. Harper, et al. (2004) China: Dawn of a Golden Age, 200–750 A.D. New York: Metropolitan Museum of Art.
- Jiayao, An and Annette L. Juliano, (2012) Unearthed: Recent Archaeological Discoveries from Northern China.Williamstown, Massachusetts: Sterling and Francine Clark Art Institute.
- An Jiayao (2002) "Polycrome and monochrome glass of the Warring States and Han periods" pp. 45–70 in Braghin, C. (ed) Chinese Glass. Archaeological studies on the uses and social contest of glass artefacts from the Warring States to the Northern Song Period (fifth century B.C. to twelfth century A.D.)
- Jiayao, An. (1984) “Early Glassware in Ancient China”, Acta Archaeological Sinica, Vol. 4, pp. 413–448.
- Jiayao, An.(1987) “Early Glassware” Trans. By M. Henderson. The Oriental Ceramic Society, no.12.
- Jiayao, An. (1991) “Dated Islamic Glass in China.” Bulletin of the Asia Institute 5, pp. 123–137.
- Jiayao, An. “Glass Trade in Southeast Asia” Ancient Trades and Cultural Contacts in Southeast Asia pp. 127–138.
- Jiayao, An. (1997) ‘Report on the 1995-1996 Excavation of the Hanyuan Hall Archaeological Site at the Tang Dynasty Daming Palace’, Acta Archaeologica Sinica, Vol. 3, pp. 341–406.
- Jiayao, An. (2000) ‘Excavation of the Huanqiu Ruins in the Tang Dynasty Chang’an Capital in Xi’an, Shaanxi Province’, Kaogu (Archaeology), Vol. 7, pp. 29–47.
- Jiayao, An. (2005) ‘A Study into the Design of the Dragon Tail Road of the Tang Dynasty Daming Palace’s Hanyuan Hall’ in Chinese Archaeology in the New Century : Papers in Honour of Professor Wang Zhongshu’s Eightieth Birthday, (Science Press), pp. 691–706.
