= Naziha Salim =

Iraqi artist (1927–2008)

- Born: 1927; Istanbul, Turkey
- Died: 15 February 2008 (aged 80–81); Baghdad, Iraq
- Known for: Painting

Naziha Salim (Arabic: نزيهة سليم, 10 January 1927–15 February 2008) was an Iraqi artist, educator and author. She was described by the country's president, Jalal Talabani, as "the first Iraqi woman who anchored the pillars of Iraqi contemporary art".

== Life ==
Not a great deal of scholarly attention has been given to the cultural and artistic lives of female artists. In the case of Naziha Salim, her story has been eclipsed by that of her famous older brother, Jawad Salim.

Naziha Salim was born in 1927 in Istanbul to Iraqi parents, who were originally from Mosul. At the time of her birth, her father was an officer in the Ottoman army, stationed in Turkey. The family returned to Baghdad in the 1920s, when Naziha was a small child.

She was born into a family of Iraqi artists living in Turkey. Her father, Hajji Mohammed Salim (1883-1941) was a painter, while her mother was also an artist and a skilled embroiderer. The artist Abdul Qadir Al Rassam, the first Iraqi to paint in the European style, was an older relative (possibly her father's cousin). Her older brothers were also talented artists, Rashid (b. 1918) was a political cartoonist; Su'ad Salim (b. 1918) a painter and designer who would design the coat of arms for the Iraqi Republic; Jawad (b. 1920), a painter and sculptor became Iraq's most beloved sculptor and Nizarre (b. 1925) was also an artist.

She was one of the first women to be awarded a scholarship to study art abroad. In the 1940s, she graduated from the Baghdad Fine Arts Institution and, after gaining the scholarship continued her art education in Paris. In the 1960s Salim returned to the Fine Arts Institute as a teacher and remained at the school until her retirement in the 1980s.

She was an active participant in Iraq's arts community; a foundation member of the arts group known as Al-Ruwwad, (also known as the “Avante Garde or Primitive group”); the first group of Iraqi artists to study abroad and who sought to incorporate modern European art techniques within a distinctly Iraqi aesthetic. This group had a major influence on later generations of Iraqi artists.

Naziha Salim suffered a stroke in 2003, which left her paralyzed. She lived for another five years, dying in Baghdad at the age of 81. President Jalal Talabani called her death a "big loss to Iraqi art and culture".

== Work ==
She authored a history of modern Iraqi art, entitled, Iraq: Contemporary Art, published by Sartec in 1977, which continues to be used as a valuable source for the early development of Iraq's modern art movement.

Her paintings’ themes revolve around representations of women and family; her own family, rural Iraqi women, peasant women, women at work, Mesopotamian and Arab goddesses. She participated in various experimental movements and her work often illustrated the changes taking place in women's lives. As such, Salim, along with her contemporaries, “contributed to the opening up of news cultural, social and political spaces.”

=== Paintings ===
- Dancers, date unknown
- One Night's Dream, 1978
- The Martyr’s Wife, date unknown, now in the Barjeel Collection

== See also ==
- Iraqi art
- Islamic art
- List of Iraqi artists
- * List of Iraqi women artists
- Mohammed Hajji Selim (father)
