= Ancient glass trade =

History of glass exchange and production

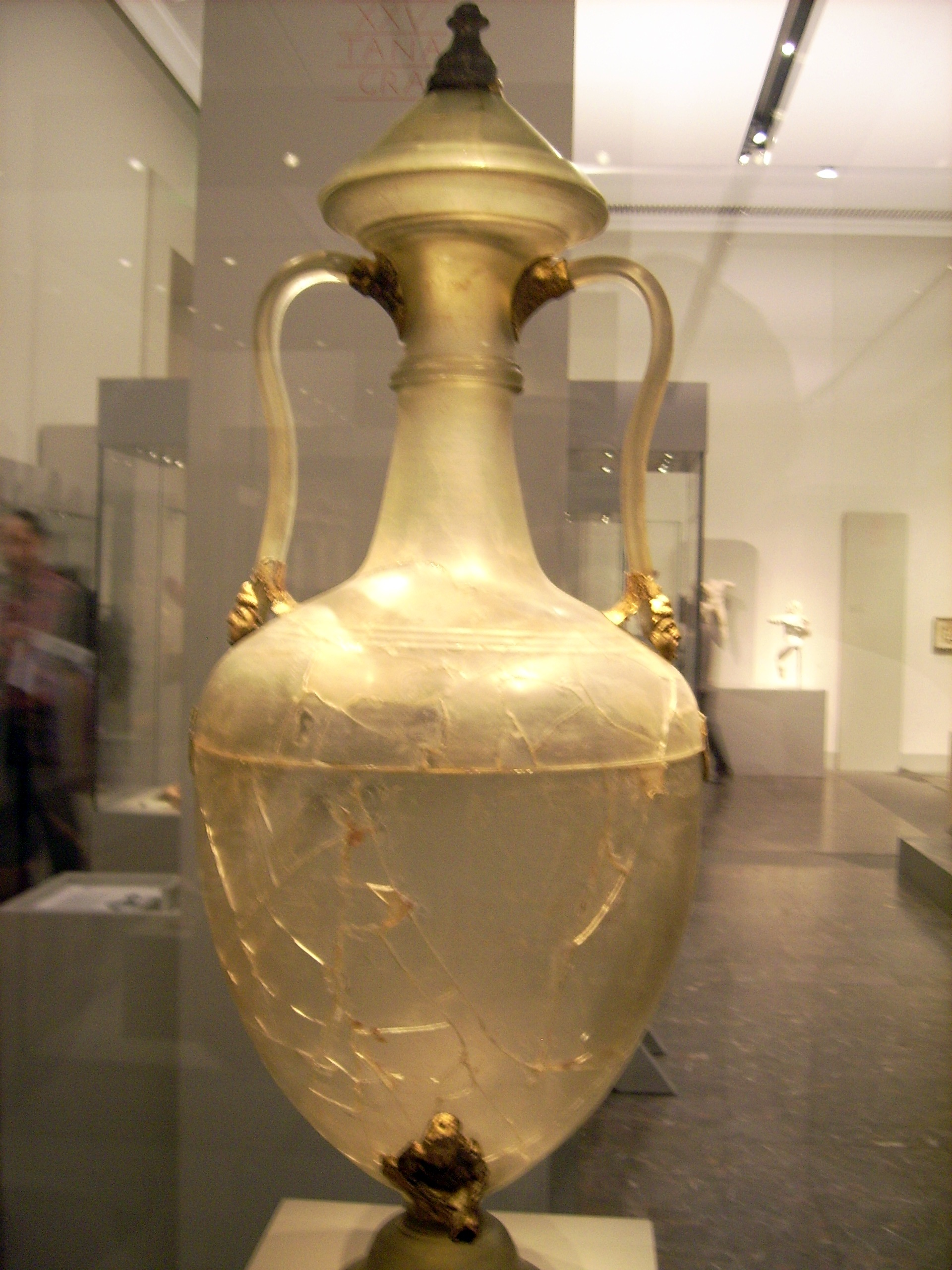
A Hellenistic glass amphora excavated from Olbia, Sardinia, dated to the 2nd century BC

The ways in which glass was exchanged throughout ancient times is intimately related to its production and is a stepping stone to learning about the economies and interactions of ancient societies. Because of its nature it can be shaped into a variety of forms and as such is found in different archaeological contexts, such as window panes, jewellery, or tableware. This is important because it can inform on how different industries of sections of societies related to each other – both within a cultural region or with foreign societies.

Glass trade is mainly studied by compositional analysis of glass objects creating groups with specific chemical compositions that hopefully allow to differentiate between production centres (both geographically and chronologically). Complications arise from the fact that for long periods of time glass was made following very similar recipes and as such the major elements found do not vary significantly. It is made by a mixture of raw materials which means that different sources of each raw material even for the same production centre further complicate the situation. That it is a material that lends itself well to recycling can only add to this. However, as scientific techniques improve it is becoming increasingly possible to discern some compositional groups, together with other archaeological and textual evidence a picture of glass technology, industry and exchange is starting to emerge.

== Mesopotamia and Eastern Mediterranean during the Late Bronze Age ==
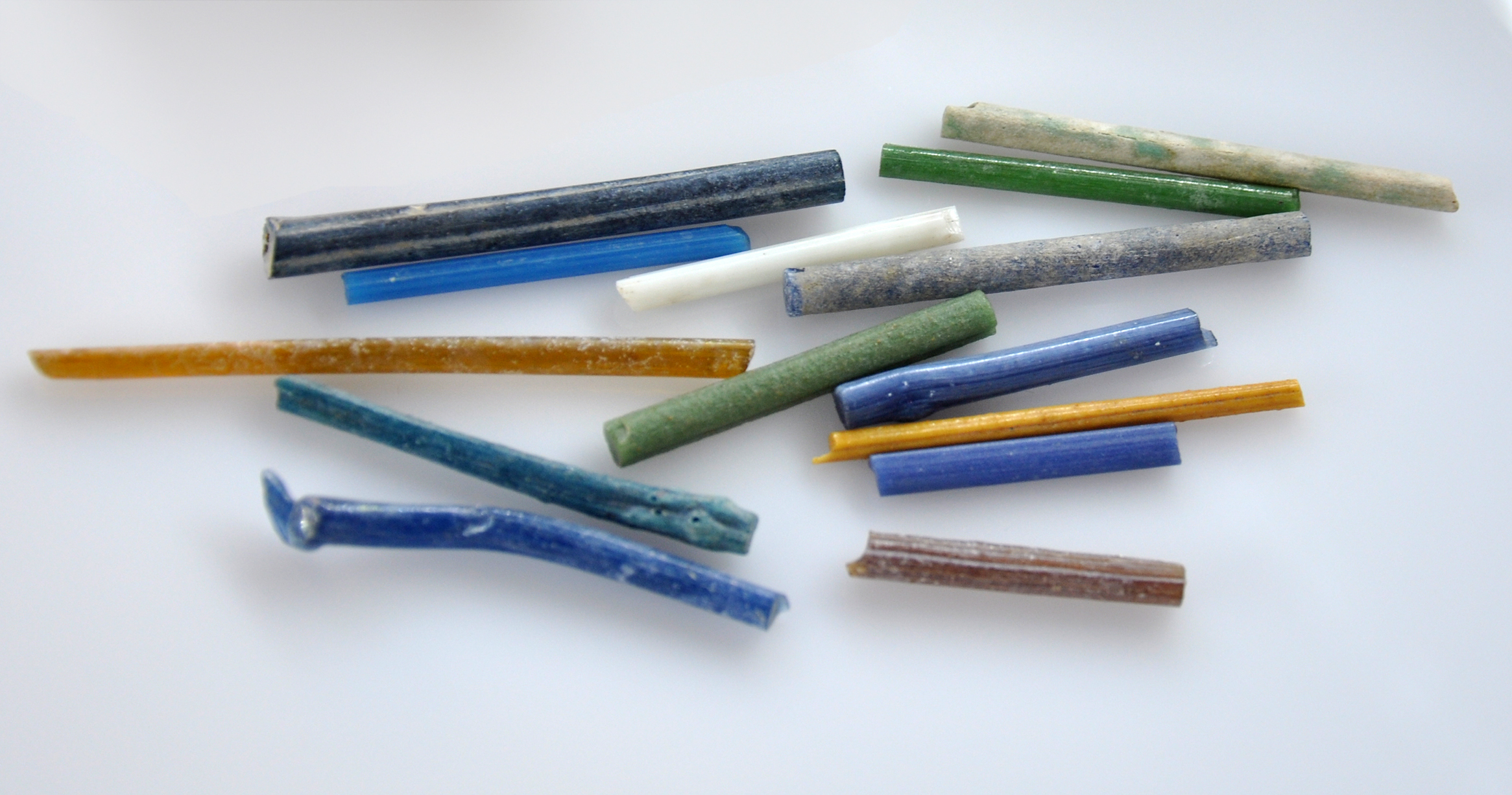
Coloured glass rods ready to be worked into finished products, excavated from an Ancient Egyptian glass workshop. 18th Dynasty, 16-14th century B.C.E.

Glass beads are known from the 3rd millennium BC, but it is only in the late 2nd millennium that glass finds start occurring more frequently, primarily in Egypt and Mesopotamia. This is not to say that it was a widespread commodity; quite the contrary. It was a material for high-status objects with archaeological evidence for the Late Bronze Age (LBA) also showing an almost exclusive distribution of glass finds at palace complexes such as that found in the city of Amarna, Egypt. Texts listing offerings to Egyptian temples would start with gold and silver, followed by precious stones (lapis lazuli) and then bronze, copper and semiprecious stones, with glass mentioned together with the lapis lazuli. In this period it was rare and precious and its use largely restricted to the elite.

Production of raw glass occurred at primary workshops, of which only three are known, all in Egypt: Amarna, Pi-Ramesses and Malkata. At the first two sites cylindrical ceramic vessels with vitrified remains have been identified as glass crucibles, where the raw materials (quartz pebbles and plant ash) would be melted together with a colourant. The two sites seem to show a specialisation in colour, with blue glass, via the addition of cobalt, being produced at Amarna and red, through copper, at Pi-Ramesses. The resulting coloured glass would then be fashioned into objects at secondary workshops — far more common in the archaeological record. It seems certain that glass making was not exclusive to Egypt (in fact, scholarly opinion resides with the industry having originally been imported into the country) as there are Mesopotamian cuneiform texts which detail the recipes for the making of glass. Further supporting this hypothesis are the Amarna Letters, a contemporaneous diplomatic correspondence detailing the demand and gift giving from vassal princes in Syro-Palestine to the Egyptian king; in these the most requested item is glass.

The evidence then points to two regions that were making and exchanging glass. It seems logical to believe that at an initial stage it was glass objects, as opposed to raw glass, that were exchanged. The major element composition of glass finds from Mesopotamia and Egypt is indistinguishable, with as much variation found within a specific assemblage as between different sites. This is indicative of the same recipe being used in both regions. As analytical techniques develop the presence of trace elements can be more accurately determined, and it has been found that glass is compositionally identical within each region, but it is possible to discriminate between them. This could allow us to uncover trade patterns; however, at present no Egyptian glass has been found in Mesopotamia, nor has any Mesopotamian glass been found in Egypt.

Across the sea, Mycenaean glass beads were found to have been made with glass from both regions. The fact that the beads are stylistically Mycenaean would imply an import of raw glass. Archaeological evidence for this trade comes from the Uluburun shipwreck, dated to the late 14th century BC. Part of its cargo consisted of the earliest known intact glass ingots: about 175 ingots of cylindrical shape, in blue shades from lavender to turquoise, as well as uncolored ones. Some ingots chemically match the glass found in the Egyptian production sites; specifically, they match by shape the melting crucibles found at Amarna.

It is not yet possible to discern if trade in glass was occurring directly between the glass producing regions and foreign consumers. It is possible that there were indirect routes via trading and seafaring partners along the Mediterranean coast. Trace element analysis of the Uluburun ingots might allow us to learn more. At this point we know glass was being consumed by the elites of Eastern Mediterranean and Western Asia; that it was produced in Egypt and Mesopotamia with workshops possibly specialising in colour and distributed locally, presumably through state control to state-sponsored artisans; and that it was exported further as raw glass ingots.

== The Mediterranean during Roman times ==
From Hellenistic times glass production sees considerable technological developments, culminating with the introduction of glass blowing in the 1st century BC. Glass objects could now be made in large scale production, faster and with less raw material, consequently becoming more common. From the early Roman times, to Byzantine and early Islamic periods the glass from Northern Europe to Eastern Mediterranean shows an incredible compositional homogeneity in its major elements. Unlike late bronze age glass, Roman glass was made from melting sand and natron – mineral soda – from the Wadi Natron in Egypt. With one raw material being common to all glass, it should be possible to differentiate between glass made from different sands by analyzing compositional variations of the trace elements and certain isotope ratios. These compositional analyses aimed to investigate two models for glass production: that glass was produced in large scale primary workshops along the Levantine coast and Egypt, mixing natron and sand from the mouth of the Belus river – as mentioned by Pliny – and then traded to local glass working workshops. If natron was traded and mixed with local sands following a strict recipe, it could result in the homogeneous composition.

Glass making furnaces have been uncovered in Israel at two sites – 17 at Bet Eli'ezer and 3 at Apollonia. These are rectangular in shape measuring about 2m x 4m and matching the size of a glass slab found inside a cave at Bet She'arim. The resulting slabs would be broken up into chunks that were traded to glass workshops in the Middle East and across the Mediterranean, as evidenced by the contemporaneous shipwrecks carrying such glass chunks.

The situation is not so simple; these workshops are dated from the 6th to the 11th century AD and while similar, the compositions do not exactly match those of the earlier Roman period. Pliny, writing in the 1st century AD, describes glass making in the Levantine coast but also in Italy, Spain and Gaul – however, any installations that could produce the large quantities of primary glass needed to supply the Roman industry have yet to be located. These same authors report a difference in isotopic ratios for oxygen and strontium that differentiates between Middle Eastern and Roman glasses. Other authors have countered the idea of a unique centralized production, with primary production reported from Northern Europe and inferred for Italy. Evidence for large scale production has only come from the Eastern Mediterranean and from latter dates, and assumes a continuing glass making tradition. That there was a large scale and centralised production even this early is evidenced by the Ouest Embiez I shipwreck – 3rd century – carrying around 15 to 18 tons of raw glass. This does not exclude smaller scale local production reported elsewhere, however. The Julia Felix, also sunk during the 3rd century AD, was carrying as part of its cargo glass cullet, presumably for recycling. Trace element analysis of colourless glass showed these were made using sands from different sources, giving some support to the de-centralised production hypothesis.

By the 9th century, the raw materials for glass shift again to quartz pebbles and plant ash, the 'forest glass' of medieval Europe. Natron was no longer in use, and the low lime composition of the Bet'eliezer glass could suggest declining access to the material from at least the 6th century onwards. The slow shift from raw glass trade and natron use in glass production suggest structural economic and political changes.

== South East Asia, Africa and the Indian Ocean ==
Glass shows up in Northern India at the end of the 2nd millennium BC, becoming more common throughout South East Asia during the following millennium. Glass beads in particular become extremely popular and, together with bangles, form the largest group of glass finds. From its Indian origins, glass beads spread as far as Africa and Japan, sailing with the monsoon winds, hence their being referred to as 'trade wind beads'. The most common compositional type, representing 40% of the glass finds for the region, is known as mineral soda-alumina glass and is found from the 4th century BC to the 16th century AD. As the name indicates, it is typically characterized by a high alumina content and was probably made by melting reh with local alumina rich sands. Through LA-ICP-MS analysis, however, Carter found that Cambodia had a large amount of glass beads made of potash glass and predominantly high alumina soda glass. Potash glass is a glass that uses potash or K_{2}O as a flux in order to decrease the melting point of the glass and is the most common type of glass found in SE Asia.

Detailed compositional data recently summarised by (Lankton, & Dussubieux 2006) has uncovered several distinct and yet contemporaneous glass technologies across the Indian Ocean, but the geographical assignment is not completely clear. Two small groups show compositions matching those of natron-based Mediterranean glass and plant-ash Mesopotamian glass, demonstrating trade with these other regions. Trade in raw glass from Egypt to India was described in the 1st century texts of Periplus of the Erythraean. The presence of Mesopotamian glass increases with increased Sasanian control of the Indian Ocean from the 4th to 6th centuries. It is also possible that some glass was traded via the Silk Road.

The majority of glass beads found in Sub-Saharan Africa predating European contact are from Indian or Sri Lankan origin with a recent paper (Dussubieux et al. 2008) demonstrating contact between Kenyan sites and Chaul on the west coast of India from the 9th to 19th centuries. Previously analysed samples from the East coast of Africa and Madagascar could potentially fit this group, but further work is still needed. Whether Chaul was the single port for trade in glass beads or part of several competing ports on that coast is still unknown. Data from a site in South Africa, near the borders with Botswana and Zimbabwe, has tentatively assigned some beads to Islamic 8th century compositions. This suggests that the old camel caravan routes that connected this region to Egypt and the Mediterranean were still in use even for glass at a site with easy access, via the Limpopo river, to the Indian Ocean trade and therefore to the West Indian glass that seems to be the most common. There is enough evidence that in ancient Sri Lanka, glass was manufactured in order for use in magnifying glasses or spectacles.

== Later periods and other geographical areas ==
- Medieval Europe and forest glass
- Slave beads – Africa and the Americas
- Ancient Chinese glass
- Early modern glass in England
