= Su'ad Salim =

- Born: Hajj Su'ad Salim; 1918; Ankara, Turkey
- Died: 2001
- Known for: Painting

Sua'd Salim (Hajj Su'ad Salim, Arabic: سعاد سليم b.1918, Ankara d. 2001, Iraq) was an Iraqi artist and cartoonist who is noted for designing the coat of arms for the Iraqi Republic along with other medals and badges of honour.

== Life and career ==
Sua'd Salim was born in Ankara, Ottoman Empire in 1918 to Iraqi parents.

His parents were both originally from Mosul in Northern Iraq, but his father, Mohammed Hajji Selim, a military officer with the Ottoman army, had been stationed in Ankara at the time of his birth. The family returned to Baghdad in the 1920s, when the children were relatively young. His father was an amateur artist who later taught drawing to the children of King Ghazi. His mother was an artist and a skilled embroiderer and his siblings, Jawad, Nizar and Naziha all became notable Iraqi artists in their own right.

He grew up in the Haidarkhana district of Baghdad and was educated at the Ma’mouniyah Primary School, the Alsharqiya School and the College of Law. After graduating, he worked as a cartoonist for several Iraqi newspapers and magazines and also worked as an art teacher. In the 1940s, he left teaching and worked for the Ministry of Foreign Affairs.

He was actively involved in the Iraqi arts scene, was one of the founders of the Friends of Iraqi art, and regularly participated in its exhibitions.

== Personal life ==
He married Madiha, the sister of Abdul Jabbar Mahmoud, the personal pilot of King Ghazi.

== Work ==
He is credited with introducing colour into some of his caricatures appearing in newspapers and magazines. However, he is noted for designing medals and badges of honour. His most significant designs include:

- Insignia for the Coat of Arms of the Republic of Iraq
- Al-Rafidian collar
- Order of Al-Rafidian
- Medal of Courage
- Silver Jubilee for the establishment of the Iraqi Army
- Martyr’s medal
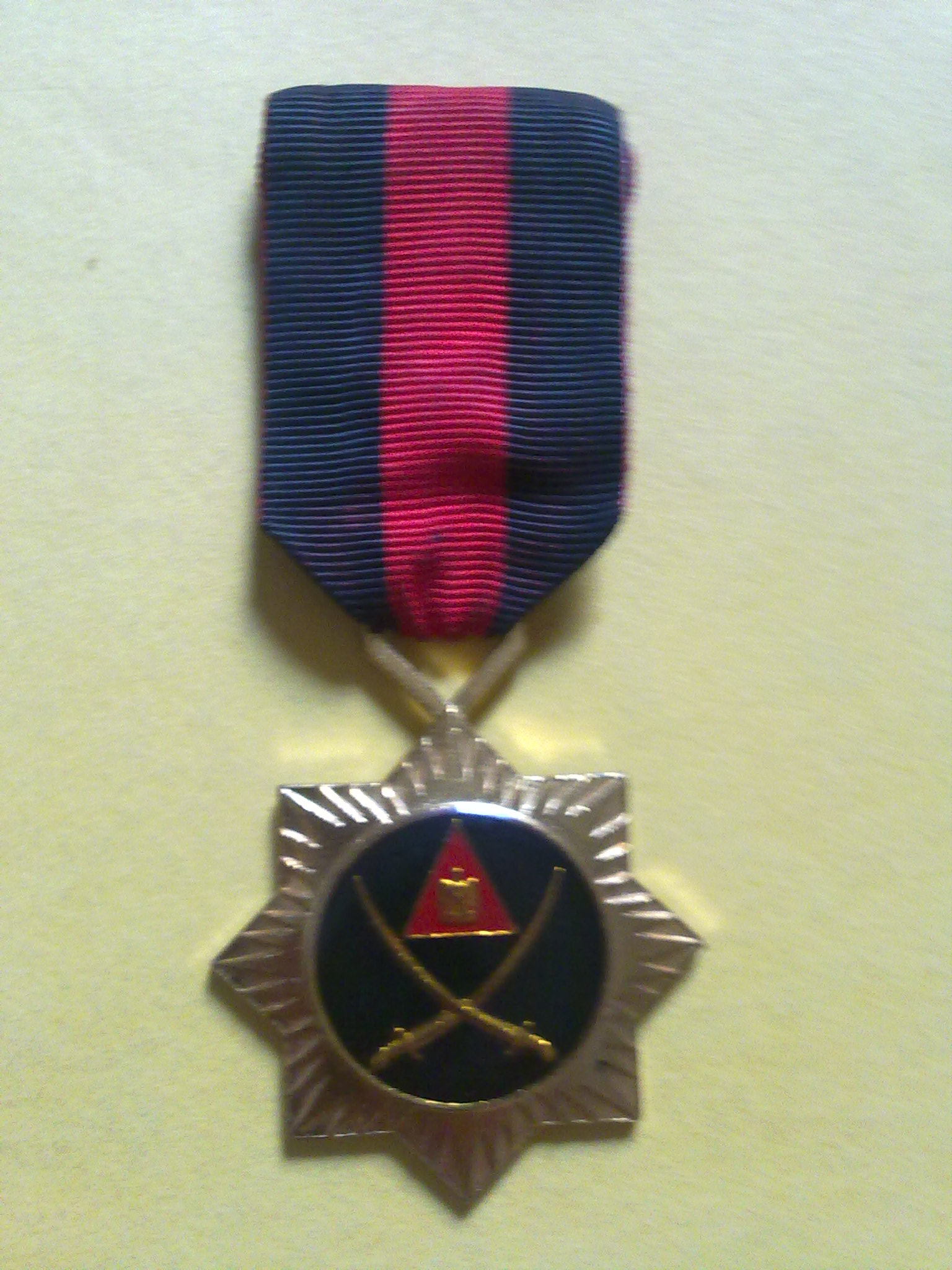
Medal of Courage, Iraq

Coat of arms of Iraq (1965–1991)

== See also ==
- Islamic art
- Iraqi art
- List of Iraqi artists
