= Mother of All Battles Medal =

Iraqi military award

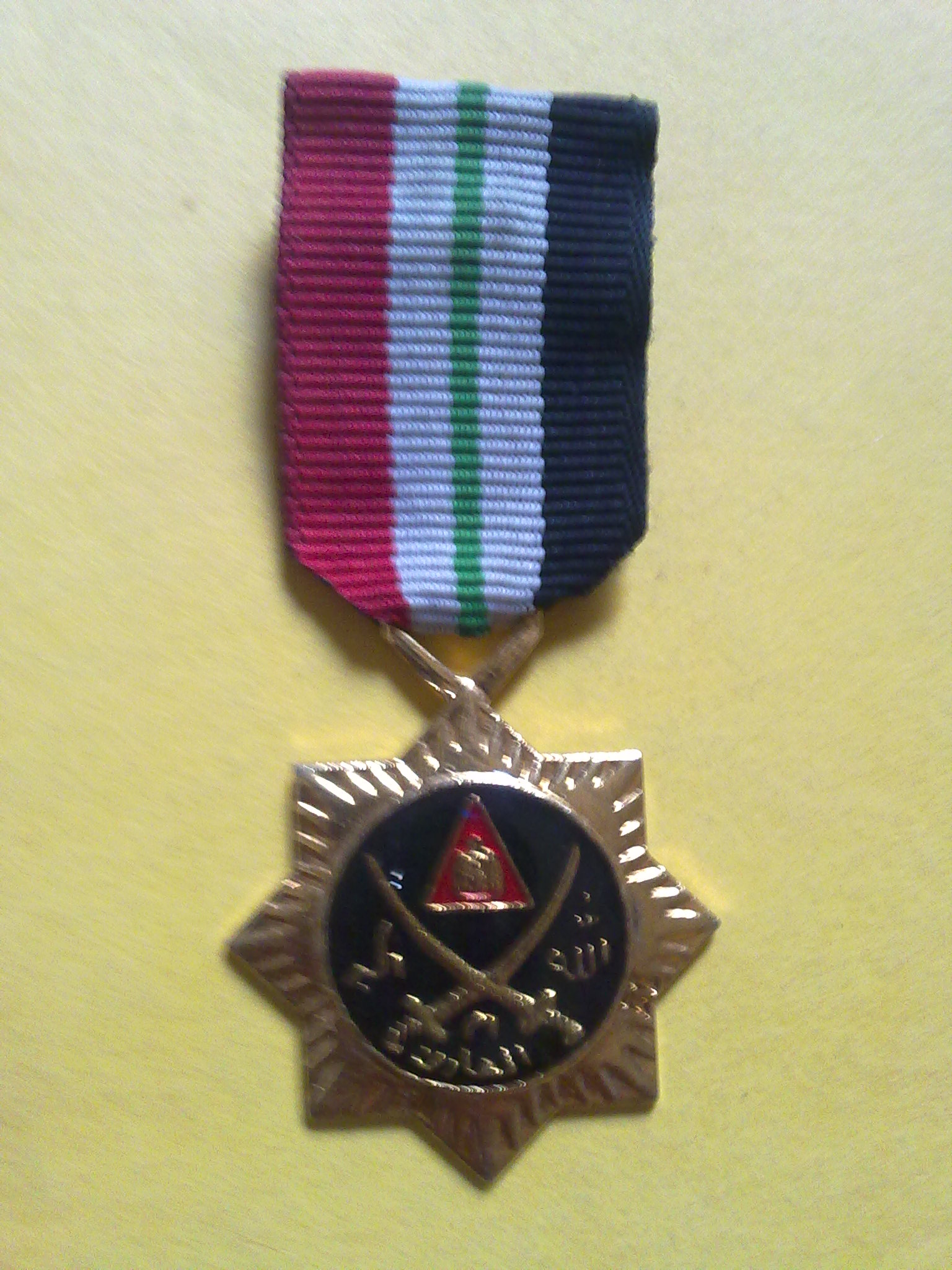
- Mother of All Battles Medal
- Type: Single-grade order
- Awarded for: Service in the Gulf War
- Presented by: Iraq
- Eligibility: Iraqi Armed Forces
- Campaign: Gulf War
- Status: No longer awarded
- Established: 1991
- Final award: 1992
- Ribbon of the Mother of All Battles Medal

Precedence
- Next (higher): Medal of Bravery

The Mother of All Battles Medal (Arabic: وسام أم المعارك, Wisam 'Um Al-M’aarik) is a medal awarded by Iraq to its military personnel who served in the Persian Gulf War. One of the primary medals issued during the Gulf crisis was the Um Al-M'aarek Medal, one of two honors created specifically for the 1990 conflict. It was presented to members of the Iraqi armed forces who fought against the coalition during the First Gulf War.

The phrase “Um Al-M'aarek”, meaning “Mother of All Battles”, is an Iraqi expression referring to the Gulf War. An associated decoration, the Um Al-M'aarek Badge, was established after the war in 1991 to recognize both military and civilian individuals who went above and beyond in supporting Iraq's efforts against coalition forces.

These awards originate from the Saddam Hussein era and were given to all personnel involved in the invasion of Kuwait and the subsequent coalition confrontations.

== See also ==
- Southwest Asia Service Medal, U.S. equivalent
