= Abdul Qadir Al Rassam =

Iraqi artist (1882–1952)

- عبد القادر الرسام
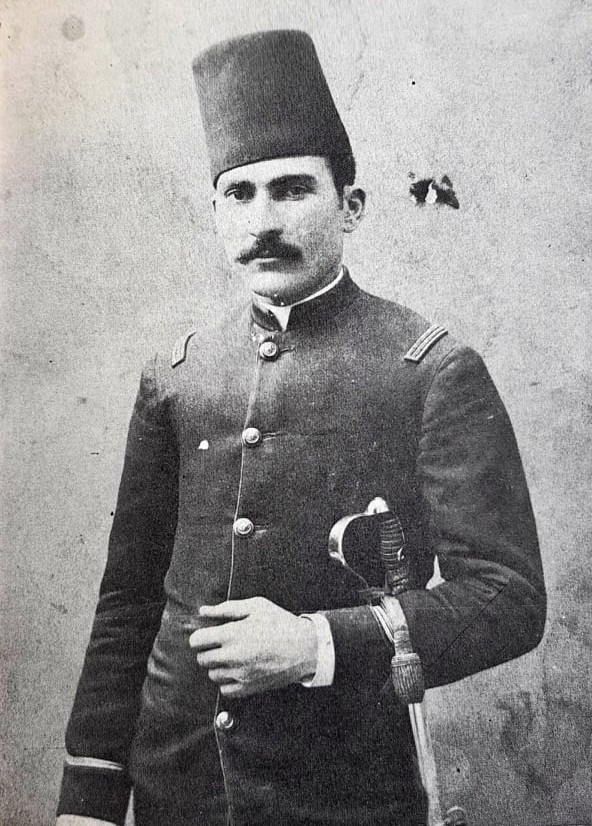
- Photographic portrait of Abdul Qadir al-Rassam in about 1905
- Born: 1882
- Died: 1952 (aged 69–70)
- Education: Military College, Istanbul, Turkey
- Known for: Painter
- Movement: Realism

Abdul Qadir Al Rassam (1882-1952, Arabic: عبد القادر الرسام) was born in Baghdad, Ottoman Iraq. He was one of the first generation of Iraqi artists to study abroad and paint in the European style. He was influential in terms of introducing local audiences to European art. He is noted for his portraits and landscapes, painted in the Realist style.

== Life and career ==
Abdul Qadir Al Rassam was born in the Maysan Province, Qal'at Saleh District in 1882. Qadir's life straddled two distinct eras in Iraqi history: he was born during Ottoman rule and died in the royal era (1921–1958). He was the first well-known painter in modern Iraq and the leader of realism school in Iraq.

He studied military science and at the Military College, Istanbul, Turkey, (then the capital of the Ottoman Empire) from 1904, where drawing and painting were part of the curriculum. There, he was exposed to the European traditional style and learned to paint in the naive manner of the Turkish soldiers. Along with contemporaries, Salim Mohammed Saleh Zaki (1888–1974) and Hajj Mohammed Salim (1883–1941) who was a relative; all of whom also studied at the Military Academy, this group of Iraqi artists were first generation to paint in the European style. This group became known as the Ottomon artists.

During his military career, he was stationed in Istanbul. However, after retiring in the 1920s, he returned to Baghdad. His wife and family, however refused to leave Istanbul, forcing the artist to live alone in a house in Baghdad. Carpet Ghazi recalled visiting the artist with his father in the 1930s:

His house was medium and large and consisted of two layers. The ground floor consisted of Al-Hawsh, Tarmah, Sardab, the kitchen, the bathroom and the upper floor. It consisted of a room allocated for the reception and another bedroom. And the basement was filled with his paintings scattered in the walls of the house. The most important thing that drew attention was a painting on the wall facing the ladder to a soldier who clutched his sword and was placed in the staircase opposite the painting, Whenever a man goes up to the staircase, he is frightened and fanciful, imagining that the soldier with the sword and his sword is a real guard, a trick prepared by the painter to frighten the thieves... Abdul Qadir was a fine-grained man dressed in a straw hat and then replaced by a Faisaliah and put on white glasses. He lived alone in this house and was served by an old man who ran the house.

Along with artists, Mohammed Hajji Selim (1883–1941), Asim Hafidh (1886–1978) and Mohammed Saleh Zaki (1888–1974), he formed part of a small group of Iraqi artists modern Iraqi artists to take up easel painting and generally work in the European style. This group of painters became known as the Ottoman artists and were largely responsible for stimulating an interest in Western art amongst the Iraqi population, which in turn, inspired the next generation of modern Iraqi artists. Many of Iraq's modern artists began their careers by taking lessons with one of the Ottoman group of artists.

He was the first local artist to offer painting lessons in his studio, and many modern Iraqi painters began their careers by studying with him. He became a major figure among the first generation of modern Iraqi artists and was a founding member of the Art Friends Society (AFS, Jami’yat Asdiqa’ al-Fen).

He was primarily a landscape painter, and painted many landscapes of Iraq in the realism style, using shading and composition to suggest time periods. A prolific painter of oils, the majority of his works are now in private hands. A small collection of his work is hung in The Pioneers Museum, Baghdad, but many of these works were looted in 2003. He was also the first modern Iraqi artist to paint a mural in a public building - at the entrance to the Cinema Royal in Baghdad.

Very little is known about his early life and career. It was only when the researcher and art historian, Jabra Ibrahim Jabra investigated the history of art education in the city of Amarah 1917–1958 that his name was found in the Register of Teachers in the school of Qal'at Saleh for 1916.

== Work ==
He painted scenes of everyday life in Iraq and landscapes, especially of area around the Tigris and Euphrates Rivers. A collection of his work is in The Pioneers Museum, Baghdad.

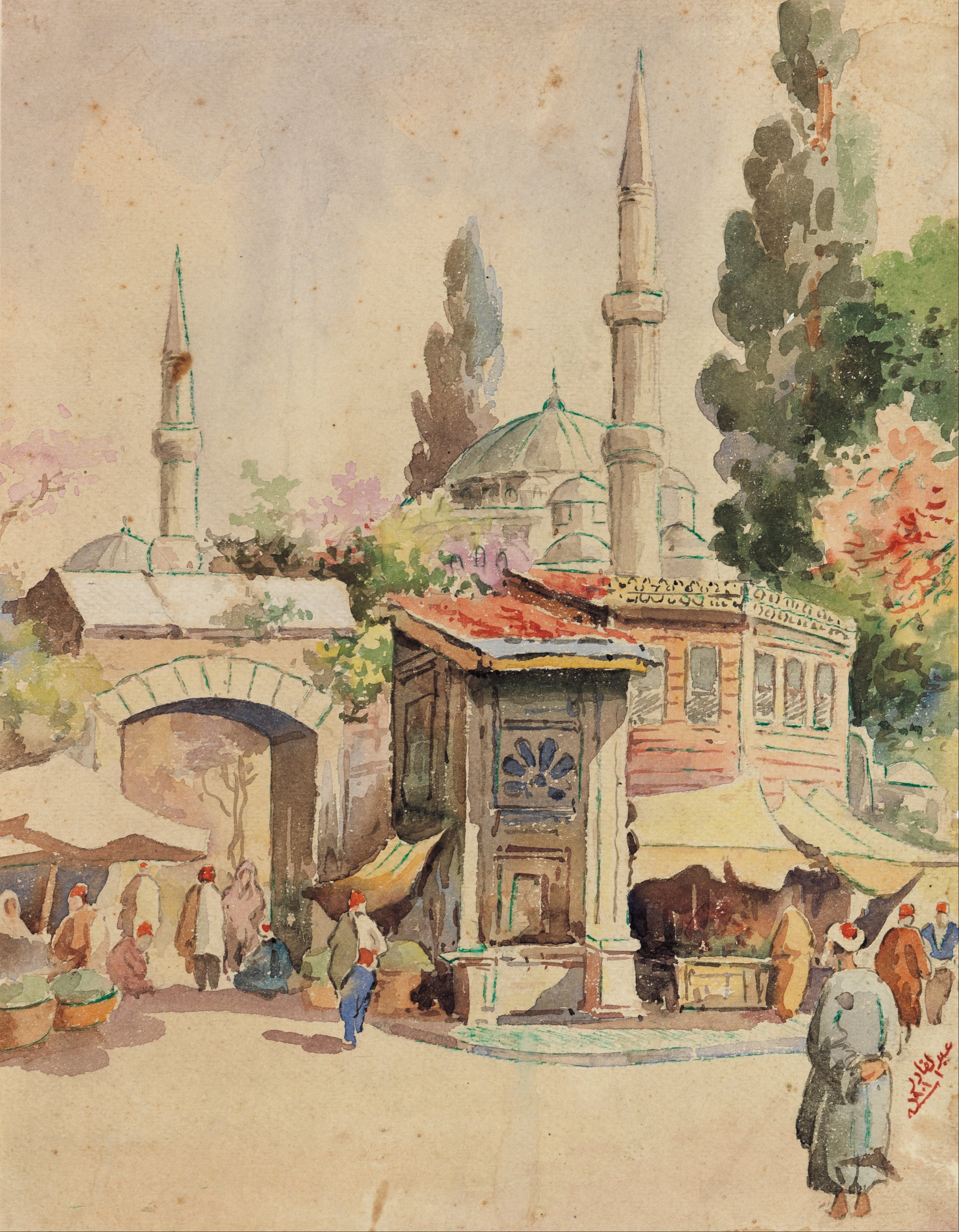
Untitled watercolor on paper, 350 × 270 mm. Mathaf: Arab Museum of Modern Art, 1901

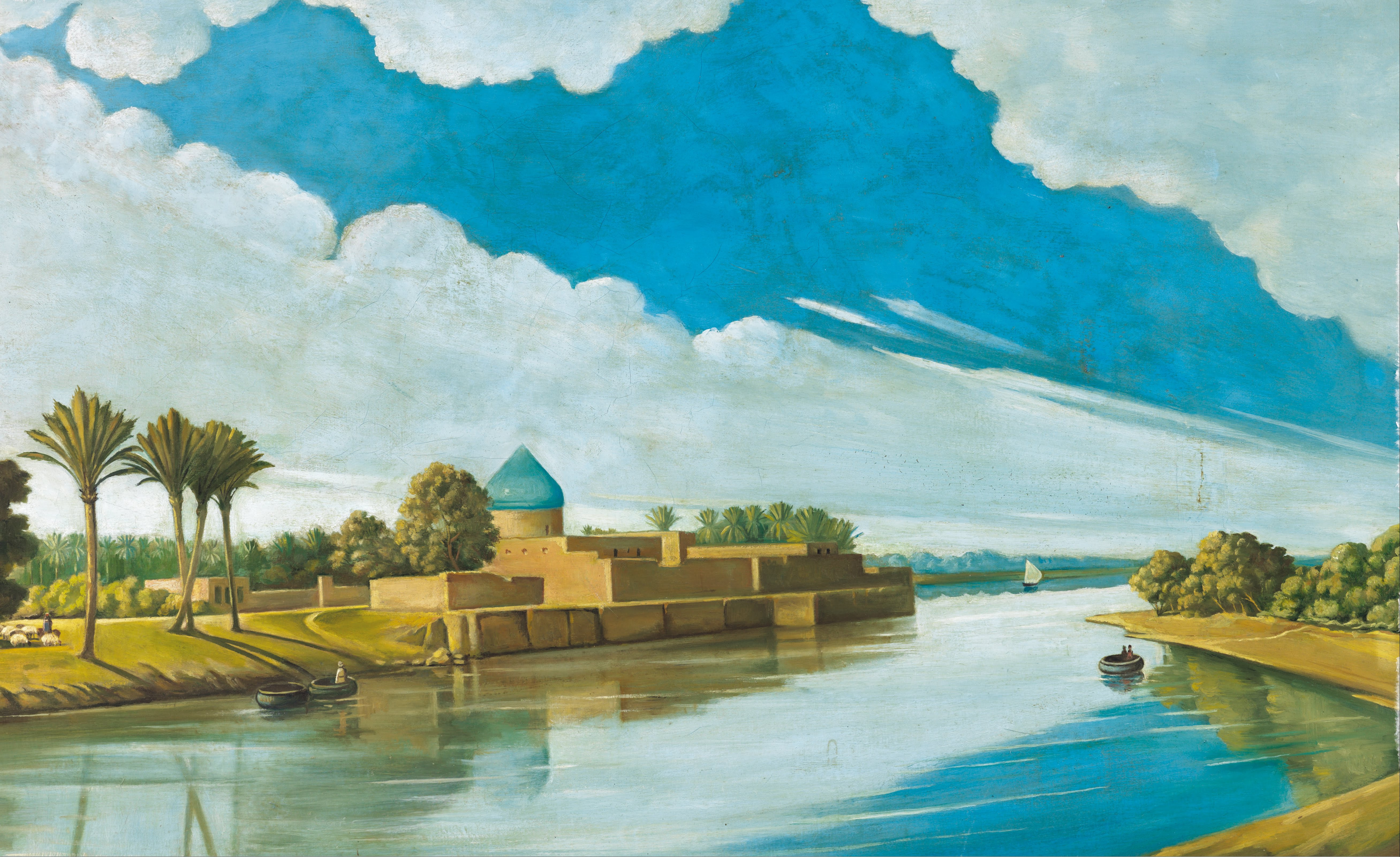
River Scene on the Banks of the Tigris, 1920, oil on canvas, 631 × 982 mm. Mathaf: Arab Museum of Modern Art.

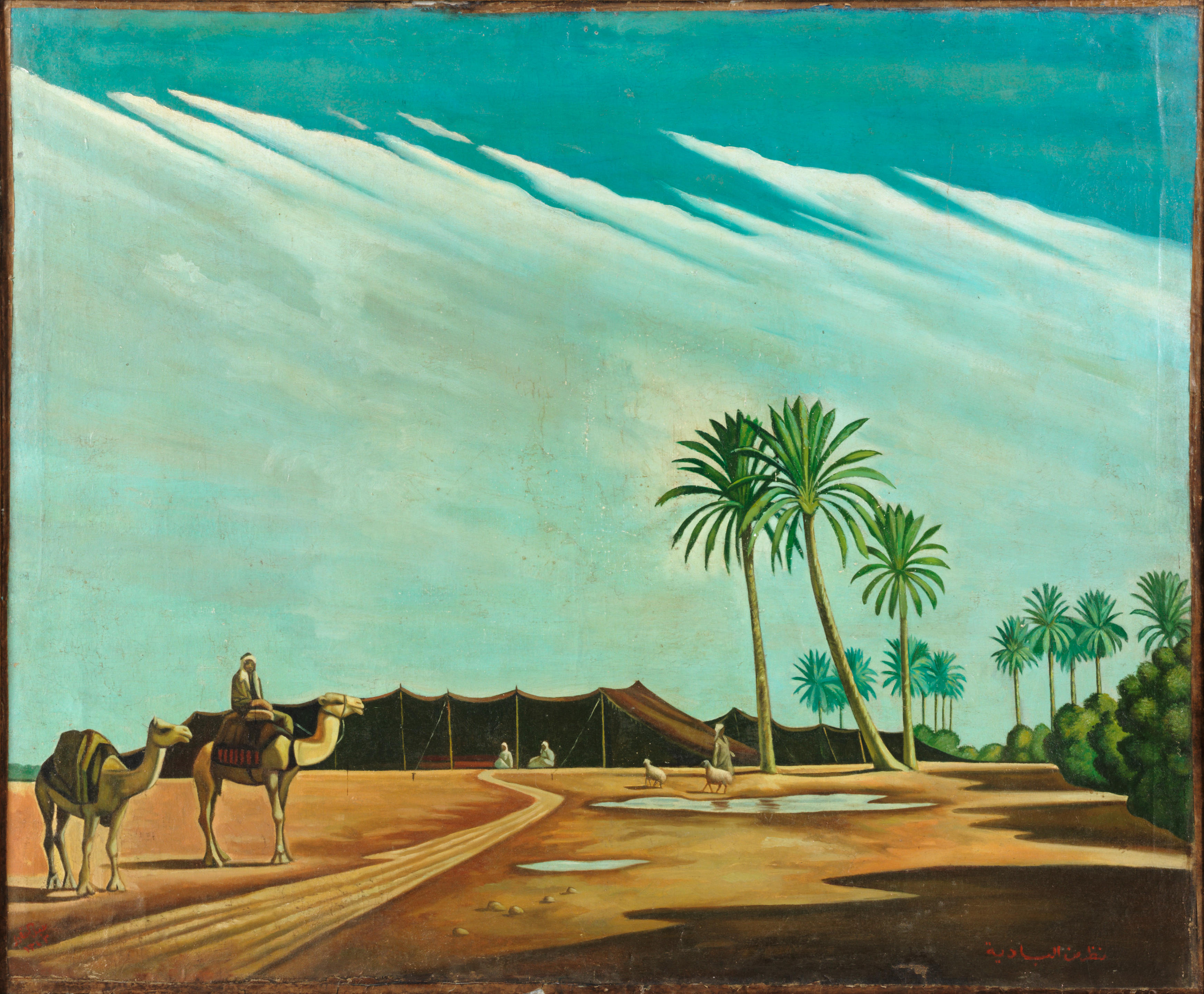
View of Bedieh, (The Wilderness) no date, 1901–1920

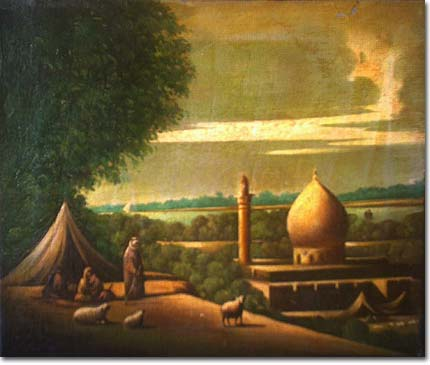
View of Baghdad, oil on canvas, 23 × 30cm, 1915–1920

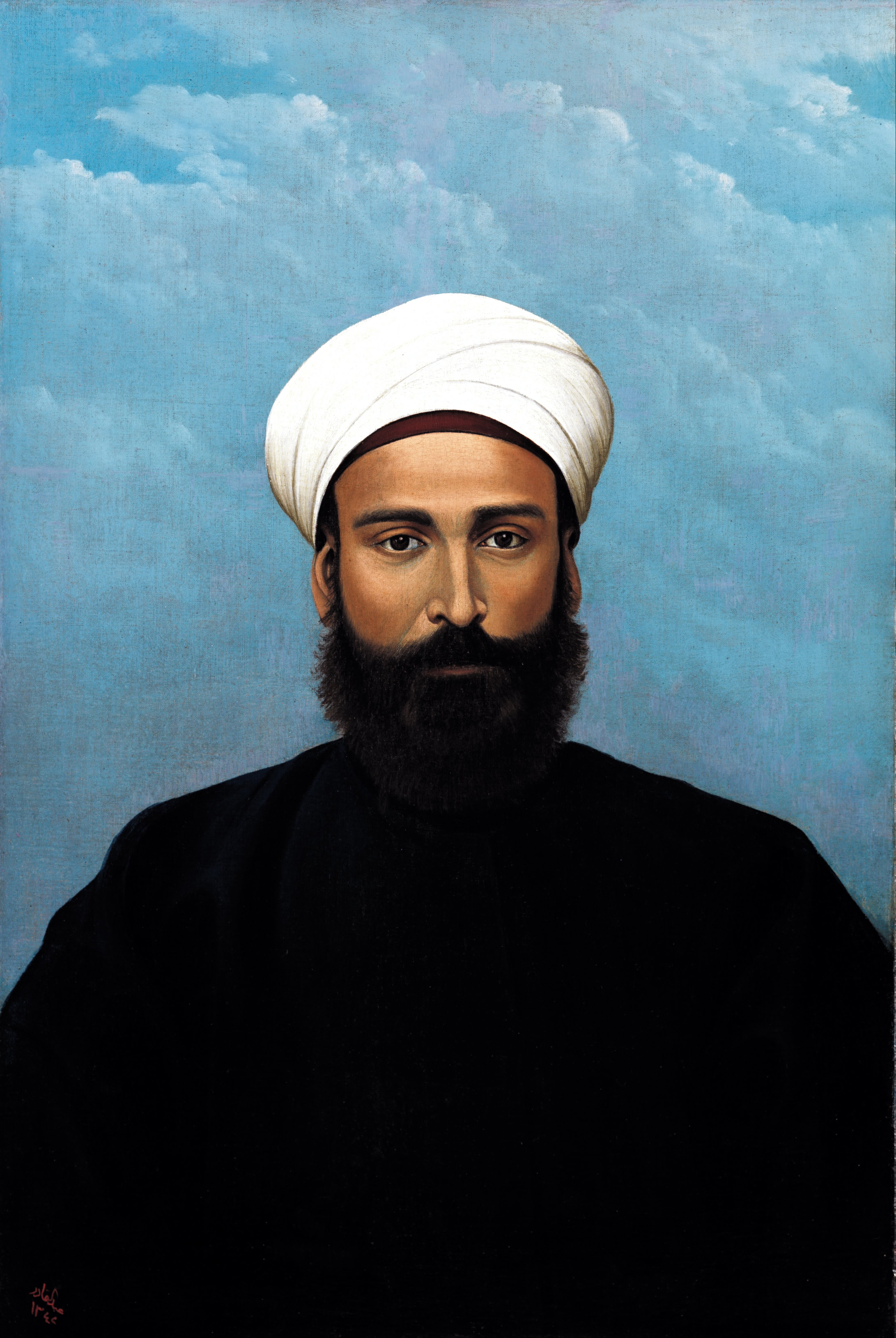
Portrait of Mohamed Darouich al Allousi, 1924, oil on canvas, 892 × 595 mm. Mathaf: Arab Museum of Modern Art.

Select list of paintings

- A Military Encampment on the Banks of the Euphrates, 1936
- View of Baghdad, date unknown

== See also ==
- Iraqi art
- Islamic art
- List of Iraqi artists
- List of painters
