= Asim Hafidh =

Iraqi artist, educator and writer

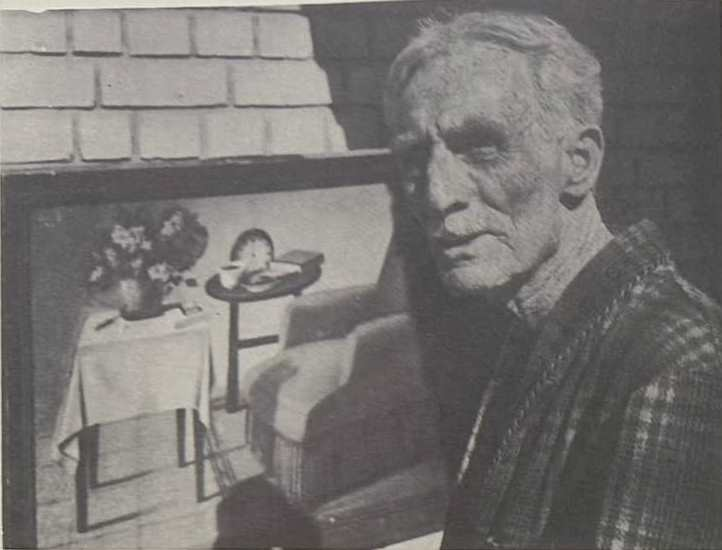
- Born: Asim Hafidh (عاصم حافظ); 1886; Mosul, Ottoman Empire
- Died: 1978 (aged 91–92)
- Education: Rashidiya Military Academy, Baghdad; Military Academy, Istanbul
- Known for: early Iraqi painter to adopt Western style
- Notable work: Rules for Drawing from Nature (book)
- Style: Classical

Asim Hafidh (Arabic: عاصم حافظ, alternatively Asem Hafedh or Assim Hafiz; 1886–1978) was an Iraqi artist, educator and writer. He was amongst the first Iraqi artists to study painting in the European style and was part of a group known as the Ottoman artists who were credited with bringing easel painting to Iraq. He is noted for publishing the first Iraqi book on fine art, entitled Rules for Drawing from Nature.

== Life and career ==
Asim Hafidh was born in Mosul in 1886. He received his earliest education in Mosul and later enrolled in the Rashidiya Military Academy in Baghdad and later joined the Military Academy in Istanbul.

He left the military and travelled to Paris, where he studied painting under Professor Antoine Reynold, remaining there for four years and completing his studies in 1931. He subsequently returned to Mosul where he took up a position as an art teacher.

Along with painters, Mohammed Hajji Selim (1883–1941), Mohammed Saleh Zaki (1888–1974) and Abdul Qadir Al Rassam (1882–1952), Hafidh was part of a small group of Iraqis to study in Europe, and subsequently the first to take up easel painting and work in the European style of painting. This group became known as the Ottoman artists and were largely responsible for stimulating an interest in Western art amongst the Iraqi population, which in turn, inspired the next generation of modern Iraqi artists. Many of Iraqi’s modern artists began their careers by taking lessons with one of the Ottoman group of artists.

== Work ==
He painted mainly in the Classical style. In 1935 he published the first Iraqi book on fine art, entitled Rules for Drawing from Nature.

== See also ==
- Islamic art
- Iraqi art
- List of Iraqi artists
