= Mohammed Saleh Zaki =

- Born: محمد صالح زكي; 1888; Baghdad, Iraq
- Died: 1974 (aged 85–86); Baghdad, Iraq
- Known for: Painting

Mohammed Saleh Zaki (Ar: محمد صالح زكي) (1888-1974), also known as Abu Zaid ('Zaid's father' - referring to his eldest son Zaid Mohammed Salih Zaki), was an Iraqi artist and one of the first generation of Iraqi painters to be trained in Western painting methods. Part of a group of artists, known as the Ottomans, he and his contemporaries were credited with bringing a European aesthetic to Iraqi art and encouraging a generation of local contemporary artists.

== Life and career ==
Mohammed Saleh Zaki was born in Baghdad in 1888 and died there in 1974. He completed his education in Baghdad and later graduated from the Military Academy in Istanbul, Turkey, where drawing and painting were an integral part of the curriculum. He was an officer in the Iraqi military at the time of the establishment of the national rule, becoming a Commander of the Royal Guard.

Throughout his military career, he pursued painting as a hobby. After he returned to Baghdad, he furthered his art education there.

Along with painters, Mohammed Hajji Selim (1883-1941), Asim Hafidh (1886-1978) and Abdul Qadir Al Rassam (1882-1952), he was part of a small group of Iraqis who were the first group of artists to take up easel painting and generally work in the European style. This group of painters became known as the Ottoman artists and were largely responsible for stimulating an interest in Western art amongst the Iraqi population, which in turn, inspired the next generation of modern Iraqi artists. Many of Iraqi’s modern artists began their careers by taking lessons with one of the Ottoman group of artists.

He travelled to Europe in 1938, where he visited art museums and painted his observations of foreign lands. He retired in 1972.

== Work ==
He focused on painting landscapes, primarily in the Realist style. He also painted works depicting Iraq’s military history.

== See also ==
- Iraqi art
- Islamic art
- List of Iraqi artists
