= Mohammed Hajji Selim =

Iraqi artist

- Born: 1883; Baghdad, Iraq
- Died: 1941 (aged 57–58); Baghdad, Iraq
- Education: Military Academy, Istanbul
- Known for: Painter
- Movement: Realism

Mohammed Hajji Selim (1883-1941) was among the first generation of modern Iraqi artists to receive a European arts education. He was a talented amateur artist who produced still lifes, landscapes and portraits, most of which have not survived. He is mainly remembered as the patriarch of an artistic dynasty and as the father of the distinguished sculptor, Jawad Saleem.

== Life and career ==
Mohammed Hajji Selim was born into a well-to-do family in Baghdad in 1883. His parents were both originally from Mosul in Northern Iraq. Like many of his contemporaries, Selim was educated at the Military Academy in Istanbul where drawing and painting were a standard part of the curriculum. This exposure to Western art techniques, encouraged Selim to take up painting as an amateur artist.

Selim was part of a small group of Iraqi artists comprising; Asim Hafidh (1886-1978) and Mohammed Saleh Zaki (1888-1974), which formed the first modern Iraqi artists to take up easel painting and generally work in the European style. This group of painters became known as the Ottoman artists and were largely responsible for stimulating an interest in Western art amongst the Iraqi population, which in turn, inspired the next generation of modern Iraqi artists. Many of Iraqi’s modern artists began their careers by taking lessons with one of the Ottoman group of artists.

During the Ottoman reign, Selim became an officer in the Ottoman Army and, in the first decade of the 20th century, he was stationed at Ankara, where his youngest children were born. Selim eventually settled in Baghdad in the 1920s where he worked as Government employee in Baghdad's Maidan Quarter.

He became the patriarch of a dynasty of highly talented artists; the father of contemporary artists - Rashid Salim (b. 1918); Su'ad Salim (b. 1918 Ankara), Jawad Saleem (b. 1920 Ankara), Nizar (ou Nazar) Selim (b. 1925 Ankara) Naziha Salim (b. 1927 Istanbul). Of his children, Rashid became a painter and political cartoonist; Jawad became a painter and sculptor responsible for the monumental work known as the Nasb al-Hurriyah in Baghdad's Liberation Square; Suad became an artist and designer who designed the coat of arms for the Iraqi Republic, Nizar was an artist and Naziha became a painter, art educator and author.

Selim reportedly gave painting away after recognising the genius of his son, Jawad.

== Work ==
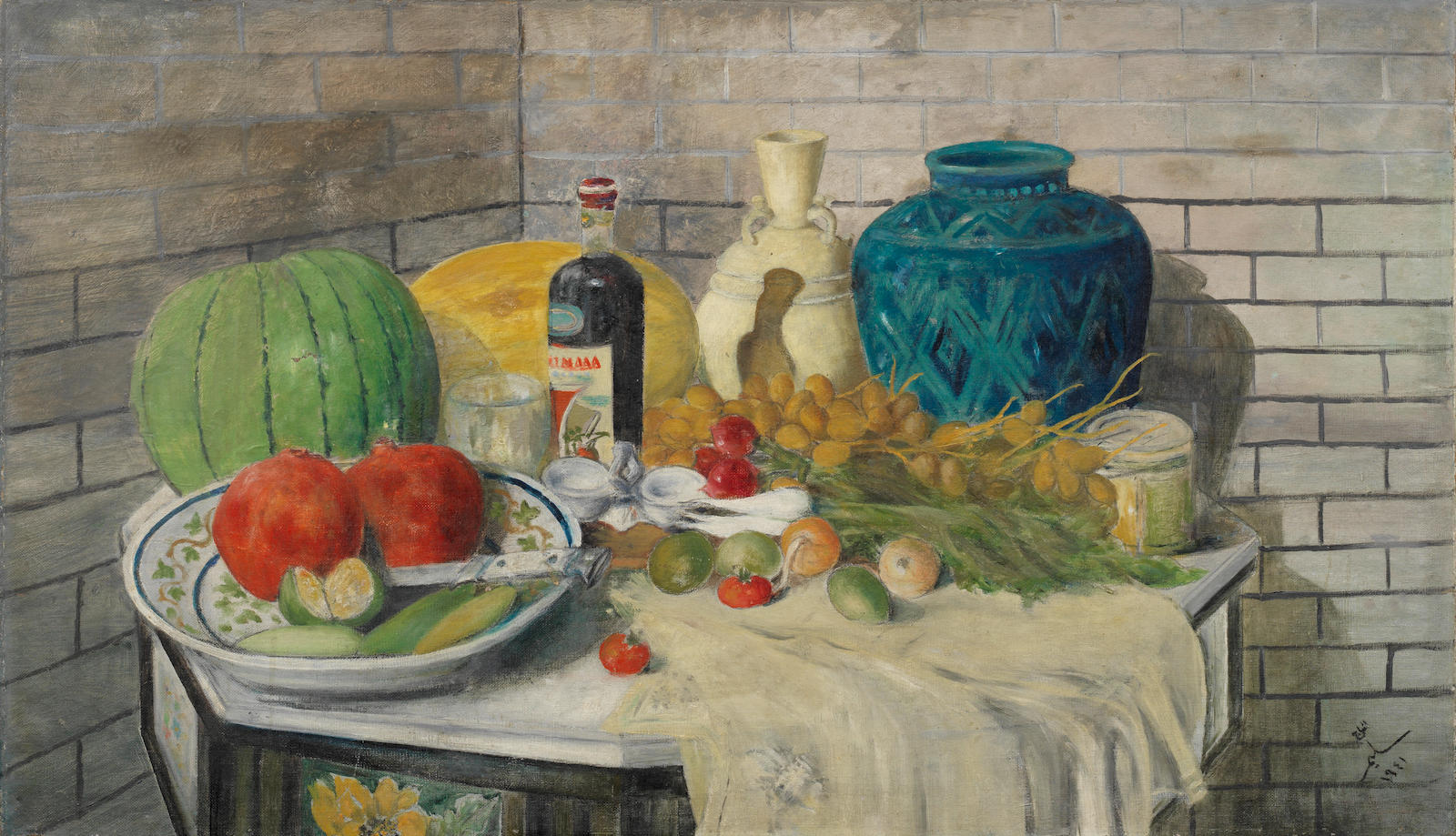
Still Life by Mohammed Hajji Selim, 1941

Selim painted in still life, portrait and landscape, but few of his paintings survived the ravages of revolution, war and looting that afflicted Iraq throughout the 20th century. His most well-known surviving work is Still Life (pictured) painted in 1941, the same year as his death.

== See also ==
- Iraqi art
- List of Iraqi artists
