= Conservation and restoration of archaeological sites =

Process in archaeology

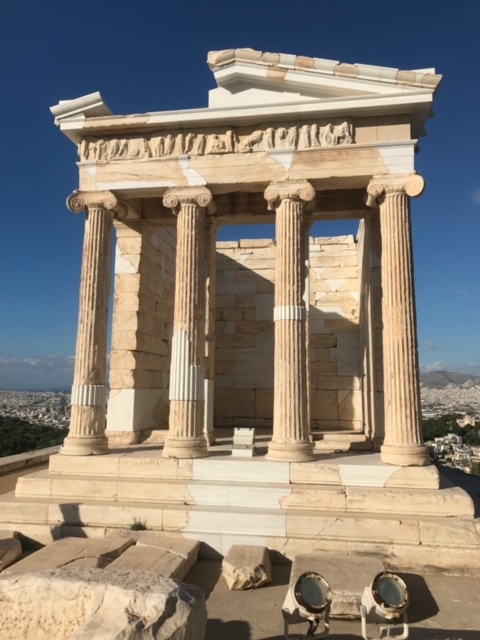
Temple of Athena Nike

The conservation and restoration of archaeological sites is the collaborative effort between archaeologists, conservators, and visitors to preserve an archaeological site, and if deemed appropriate, to restore it to its previous state. Considerations about aesthetic, historic, scientific, religious, symbolic, educational, economic, and ecological values all need to be assessed prior to deciding the methods of conservation or needs for restoration. The process of archaeology is essentially destructive, as excavation permanently changes the nature and context of the site and the associated information. Therefore, archaeologists and conservators have an ethical responsibility to care for and conserve the sites they put at risk.

== Site lifecycle ==
Archaeological sites go through many phases.

1. Creation of Site: The site is constructed and serves a function within the culture.
2. Initial Deterioration: The site has fallen out of use or has been abandoned. Forces of nature, such as wind and water, may shift the site and cause instability. Dust and dirt may settle on top of the site. Animals and insects may settle into the site, feeding on and destroying organic materials.
3. Identification: The site is identified by archaeologists or locals or other non-professionals.
4. Excavation: The site is excavated by archaeologists and the findings are documented. Sites may be primarily explored by non-professionals. This may disturb the integrity of the site, prior to formal excavation. If this is the case, crucial pieces of cultural and archaeological evidence may be lost.
5. Post-Excavation Deterioration: Once again exposed to the elements, sites are vulnerable to deterioration. Archaeologists and conservators should take steps to avoid this secondary deterioration by building shelters, such as roofing, and removing delicate organic materials.
6. Ignorant Repair: Attempts are made to rebuild a site by non-professionals or professionals using inappropriate methods. This can result in further damage to the site. The use of incorrect materials or a lack of understanding of the prior state of the site can lead to deterioration.
7. Correct Conservation: Trained professionals assess the best method of conservation through thorough analysis, in order to preserve the site. Decisions during this phase should be made with the consideration of the cultural and historical value of the site prior to conservation intervention.
8. Reburial: In the instance that leaving a site exposed may cause it further harm, a decision is made to rebury the site.

These phases may be repeated and may occur in a different order.

== Agents of deterioration ==
=== Weathering ===
Weathering is the source of most of the deterioration of archaeological sites. Wind, rain, freeze-thaw, and evaporation are extremely common and can cause erosion. Natural disasters, such as floods, fires, earthquakes, and volcanic eruptions, can cause the complete destruction of a site. The most effective way to protect archaeological sites from these larger events is to formulate a risk management plan. Archaeologists and conservators should assess threats to the site and determine material susceptibility.

=== Climate change ===
Climate projections also show that changes in rainfall (intensity and frequency), increases in temperature and frequency of heatwaves, rising sea levels and groundwater fluctuations, warmer seas and ocean acidification will also result in changes to flora and fauna, ground conditions (on and below the surface) will affect archaeological deposits and structures. Human responses to the climate crisis also impact archaeological sites.

=== Development ===
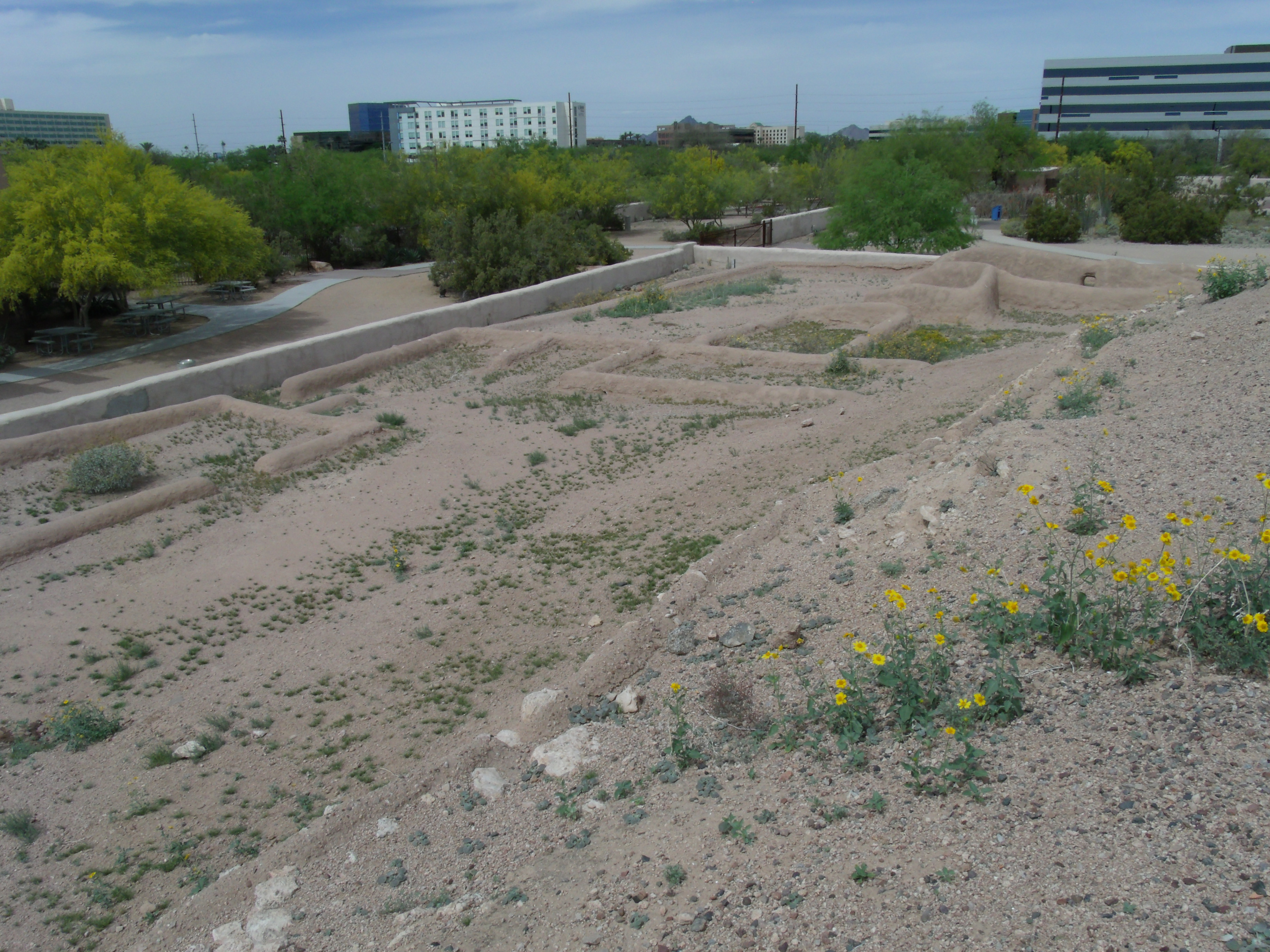
Pueblo Grande Ruin-Hohokam Village. Note the buildings in the background; this is in downtown Phoenix, Arizona.

Modern development poses a great risk to archaeological sites. Vibrations from construction can cause instability and cracking of structures. An example of the effects of modern development can be found at an ancient Puebloan site in Arizona, that dates to AD 900–1350. It was damaged by construction activities while putting in a new road. After the damage was assessed, it was determined that the site was not eligible for the National Register of Historic Places. This determination was made due to construction activities destroying any information that was important in prehistory or history that was remaining at the site.

While development cannot be discontinued simply to protect archaeological sites, having a basic understanding of what might be impacted before development takes place could help protect sites and at least the information they can provide. The Arizona Antiquities Act of 1960 is an example of some ways in which archaeological sites can be protected.

=== Vandalism ===
Vandalism is also a prominent force of damage to archaeological sites. A range of actions can be considered, including graffiti, carving, deconstruction, and burning. These can be intentional or unintentional. Intentional vandalism occurs when visitors know that there is an archaeological site and still choose to deface it in some way. Unintentional vandalism happens when the visitor vandalizes while not realizing they are at an archaeological site, such as accidents.

To protect an archaeological site from vandalism requires a combination of techniques. The most effective course of action is educating the public. This does not just entail explaining the harms of vandalism—but to educate them on the importance of these sites, and what could be lost if it is vandalized. Signage should be posted at the site to alert visitors. Another possible measure to prevent vandalism is the addition of barriers, patrols, or even full-time observation and security.

=== Looting ===
Looting is the theft of artifacts from archaeological sites. Looting is often the main source of artifacts that enter into the antiquities market, in which objects are sold domestically or exported internationally. In the United States, there are laws for the protection of archaeological sites that contain penalties for those who choose to loot or cause disturbances. The act of looting serves as a disservice to both stolen objects and the sites themselves, as objects lose their historical context and sites lose record of even having that object in the first place. Archaeologist Arthur G. Miller states, "our very strong concern is because the looting of archaeological remains destroys those sites without any record whatsoever, let alone any record of the context from which artifacts are wrenched. It is as if a few particularly attractive pages were ripped from the books of a library, and the remainder burnt. In a word, the context is destroyed without record, so that most of the information vital to the fullest study and reconstruction of the past is irremediably lost to the world."

=== War ===
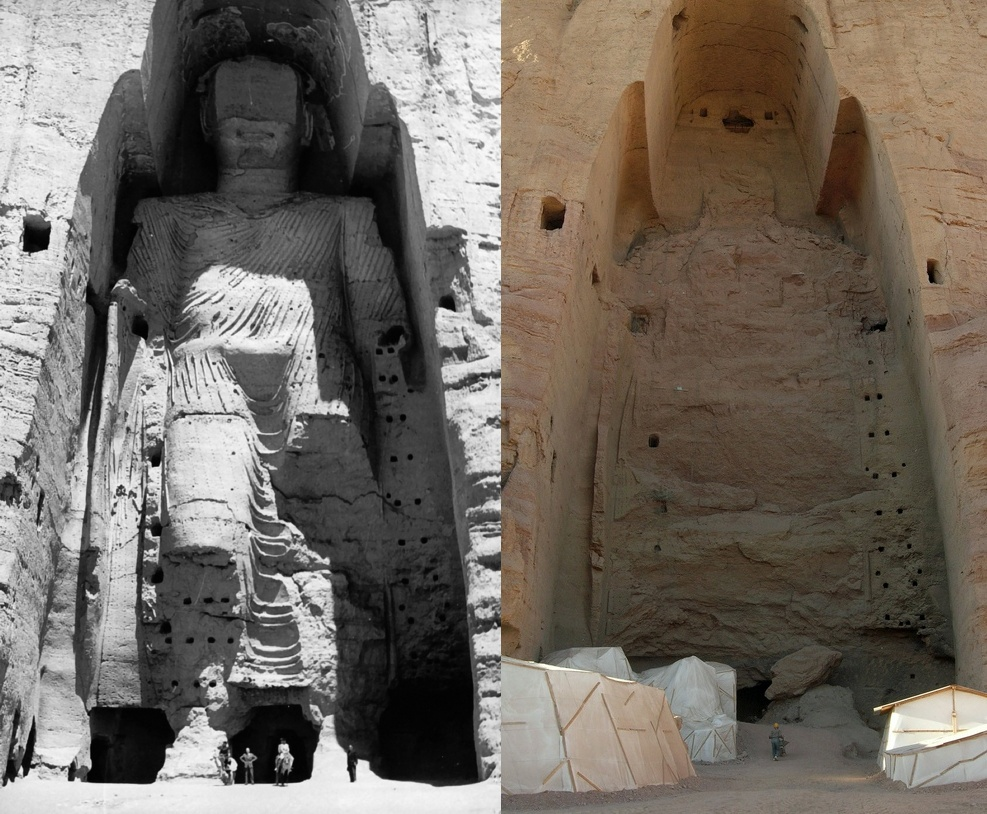
Taller Buddha of Bamiyan before and after destruction

Throughout history, war has been the source of destruction of many archaeological and historical sites. During World War II, the Nazi's destroyed many buildings during the planned destruction of Warsaw, including several palaces and other buildings dating back to before the 13th century. The prevention of destruction due to war is almost impossible without large-scale strategies. Efforts by the Monuments Men during World War II is an example of an organized plan to protect the art and history of Europe from destruction at the hands of the Nazis. The Monuments Men played a significant role in attempts to repatriate art stolen during World War II. The Rape of Europa is a book, turned documentary that explains the Nazi's systematic theft and destruction of art during the war, and the implications for international museums and art collectors that followed.

In recent times, the Taliban destroyed a sacred Buddha statue in Afghanistan.

== Personnel ==
=== Archaeologists ===
The goal of archaeologists in the conservation of excavation sites is "to preserve the physical remains of our past and to employ them in perpetuating our historical heritage". This goal can be reached by ensuring that there is thorough documentation of archaeological sites, where details of the physical characteristics of the site itself and the excavations it has endured are written down. In the case that a site is destroyed, thorough documentation can preserve the memory of how it once existed. Archeologists are turning to other methods to preserve sites and use excavation techniques that impact sites as little as possible and save their natural features. Partial excavations are currently being conducted in place of full excavations to answer research questions without causing unnecessary deterioration to sites. A previous technique involved reconstructed walls and other site features to resemble their original structure. However, this method has mostly fallen out of use, and archaeologists and conservators are now focused on preserving the site in its present state

=== Conservators ===
Conservators are the other leading voices for the advocacy and of archaeological site conservation. It is these specialists that are needed to formulate the most sustainable and effective plan for the successful preservation of sites and they do so using the help of the expertise of the archeologists that know the sites up close and personally from their own excavations as well as their own experience and knowledge. Martha Demas (2004) has created an outline that conservators can rely on to create the most effective plan:

Identification and description

Aims: What are the aims and expectations of the planning process?

- Important to establish a common ground between stakeholders and the lead organizations
- Stakeholders: Who should be involved in the planning process?
  - Can include: "Government agencies, groups with ancestral relationships to sites, local community members, tourist groups."
- Documentation and Description: What is known about the site and what needs to be understood?
  - Demas reminds us that: "The mistake that can be made with this activity is to see it simply as compiling information for its own sake. Rather, the activity needs to be seen as strategic: the results will inform the assessments and contribute to establishing policies for research and excavation, interpretation, conservation, and use of the site."

Assessment and Analysis

- Cultural Significance/Values: Why is the site important or valued and by whom is it valued?
  - Conservation is a value-driven practice: identify diverse values that make a site worth preserving. Usually "historical or artistic, research, natural, civil/social, spiritual/religious, symbolic/identity, or economic values."
- Physical Condition: What is the condition of the site or structure; what are the threats?
  - Condition Surveys are conducted to document and assess the physical state of an archaeological site. Documentation is crucial to a successful conservation effort.
- Management Context: What are the current constraints and opportunities that affect the conservation and management of the site?
  - A Management Assessment is conducted to assess any other matter that may affect the conservation of a site other than its physical condition. This may include: "legal/legislative context, financial base, power base, infrastructure, regional/local development context, visitor numbers/profile/and impact, structure of organization, staff resources and expertise, monitoring/maintenance systems, or research assessment."

Response

- Establish Purpose and Policies: For what purpose is the site being conserved and managed? How are the values of the site going to be preserved?
  - Link the assessment of values, condition, and management context of sites through policies. Demas recommends that it is useful to develop policies in "programmatic" or "activity" areas such as "appropriate use, conservation intervention, visitation and interpretation, research and excavation, and maintenance and monitoring."
- Set Objectives: What will be done to translate policies into actions?
  - "Objectives" are considered clear targets that have measurable results. Difference between "objectives" and "strategies" needs to be established here.
- Develop Strategies: How will the objectives be put into practice?
  - "Strategies" are the most detailed level of planning. It may be necessary to start from the assessment stage of a site's plan to form proper strategies for its conservation. Separate detailed plans may be formed for larger, more complex sites.
- Synthesize and Prepare Plan
  - It is suggested that the final plan be "holistic and integrated, short, concise, accessible, legally binding, and comparable with other plans."

== Visitors' impact ==
Visitors can have an impact on the conservation of archaeological sites themselves and not necessarily always positive ones. Their simple actions during visitation, even just visiting a site can be harmful to it, even serving as an agent of deterioration on their own. An example of this happened at Recapture Canyon in Utah. In 2007, the United States Bureau of Land Management (BLM) had to close access to the canyon to off-road vehicles due to the damage it was causing to local archaeological sites. However, several visitors ignored this closure and actually created a wider trail through the canyon. In May 2014, a large protest was held in this same canyon, which consisted of hundreds of people riding off-road vehicles through the canyon itself. Owing to the large number of people going through it in such a short amount of time, it is very possible that the protest itself caused further damage. While this was an example of people acting as physical forces, they can also act as other agents such as vandals/thieves or pollutants by stealing pieces of sites or artifacts, defacing the sites, or leaving waste/trash nearby.

To combat further damage, archaeological sites that are open to the public are given trails that do not impact the site while still giving visitors good views. It is important for visitors to understand their own impact on archaeological sites they visit and be mindful of how they can contribute to their deterioration if they are not careful. Such sites open to the public should educate and inform visitors of such impacts if they wish for them to be truly aware, as many are likely unaware of how easily they can become damaged. If there is a designated path, they should remain on the path and restrictions should be set for the distance between visitors and artifacts/movable parts of the site and they should be guarded well.

== Techniques ==
The purpose of any technique used on an archaeological site is to strengthen its ability to resist damage and/or reinstate its cultural significance and ability to teach about its history.

=== Restoration ===
Restoration is the "returning of the existing fabric of a place to a known earlier state by removing accretions or by reassembling existing components without the introduction of new material." The biggest difficulty in this technique is the lack of introducing new material. Ideally, this is the primary technique to strengthen the site from further damage.

=== Reconstruction ===
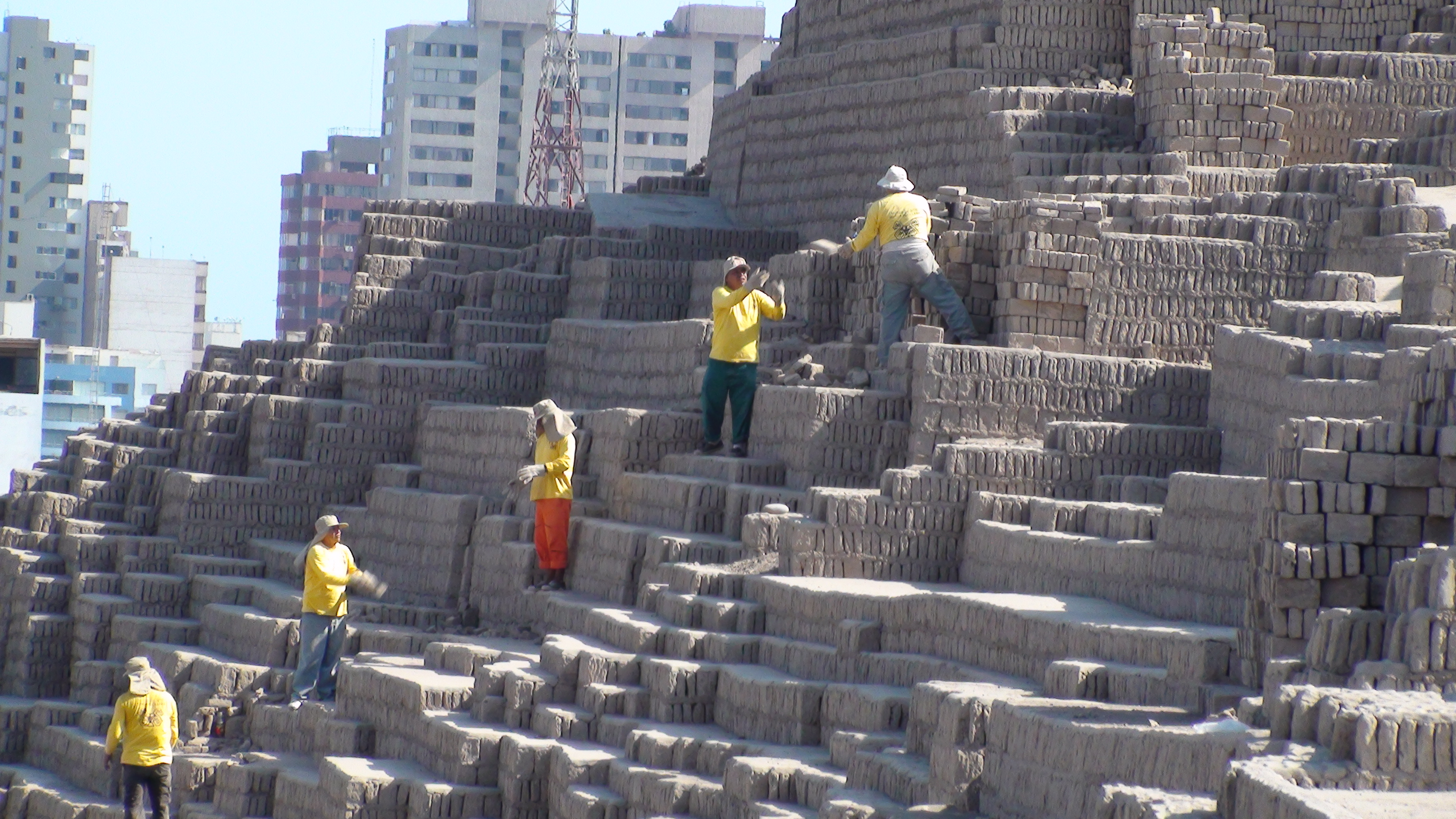
Huaca Pucllana Reconstruction Effort

Reconstruction is "returning a place to a known earlier state; distinguished from restoration by the introduction of new material into the fabric." The aim of reconstruction is to "preserve and reveal the aesthetic and historic value of the monument and is based on respect for original material and authentic documents."

There is also debate on whether this is conservation work or not, due to potential over-reconstruction. The appropriateness of this technique is highly dependent upon the region, the amount of known knowledge of the site itself, as well as the actual condition of the site. The older a site, the more difficult it is to be confident in the reconstruction. Reconstruction should also be identifiable upon inspection as well as reversible. A common form of reconstruction is the re-plastering of floors and walls. Due to weathering, the plaster that originally protected surfaces has eroded away and left the surfaces vulnerable. The re-plastering then adds that layer of protection back and in many cases was at least the same technique as originally even if it is not exactly the same material.

=== Re-creation/renovation ===
Re-creation/renovation is the "speculative creation of a presumed earlier state on the basis of surviving evidence from that place to other sites, and on deductions drawn from that evidence using new materials." This is the least favorable option as it is less likely to reinstate the originality of the site, and many times includes destroying existing authentic materials in order to add new materials. It is deemed justifiable if it is the only form of effective conservation available, or if conservation measures prove to be unfeasible.

An example of this can be seen in the work of Sir Arthur Evans at the ancient city Knossos, an archaeological site on the Greek island of Crete. Evans, a British archaeologist, excavated the site beginning in 1901 and was able to preserve and restore much of the original architecture. The restorations, carried out by three different architects, included the reinforcement and reconstruction of buildings, rooms and frescoes. Yet, these renovations have faced criticism throughout the years and "what is restored does not accurately reflect what was found. Instead, a grander, and more complete, experience is presented. For example, when you visit Knossos, because of the way it is reconstructed, it is very easy to believe that all that was ever found there was a Late Bronze Age palace", instead of a place that stood well into the Roman era.

=== Relocation ===
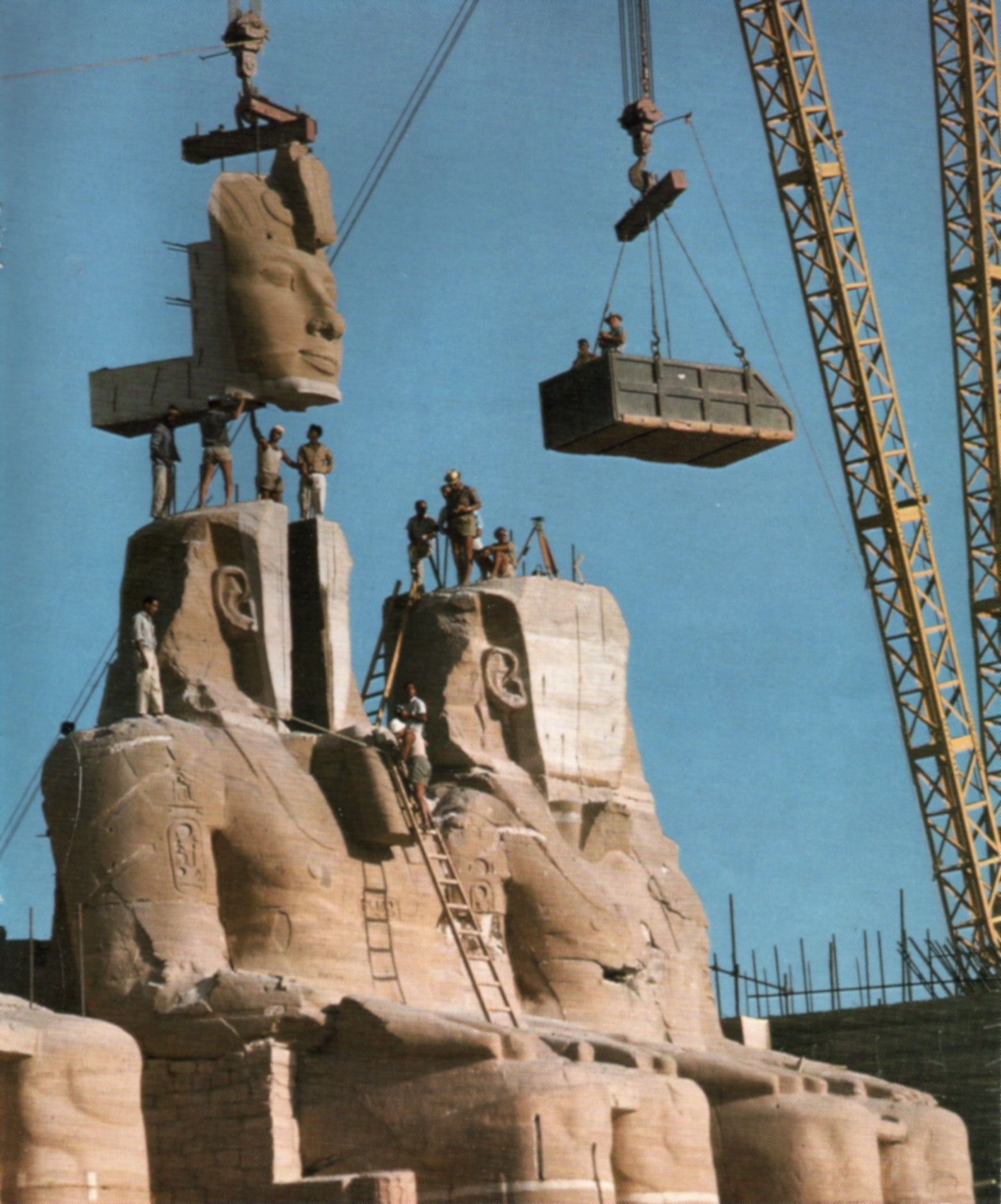
Mid-move of the Abu Simbel Temples

Relocation is a dramatic form of conservation which involves the physical movement of the site or part of the site itself. This should only take place if the site would be heavily damaged or even eliminated if it were to not be moved. A famous example of this is the move of the Abu Simbel temples. The movement of these temples was expensive as well as challenging, but if the move did not take place they would be completely underwater due to the construction of the Aswan High Dam.

== Laws and policies ==
=== United States ===
- Antiquities Act of 1906
  - First United States law to provide protection of cultural heritage.
  - Gives the President the authority to set aside land for the protection of historic and prehistoric sites and objects of historic or scientific significance; to be labeled as "National Monuments."
  - Excavations and research on sites can only be done after a permit has been issued.
  - Any artifacts collected must be curated in a museum or stored in a repository for preservation and public benefit.
  - Proved ineffective in the 1970s as prosecution of looters failed.
  - Replaced by the Archaeological Resources Protection Act of 1979 (ARPA)
- Archeological and Historic Preservation Act (AHPA) (1974)
  - Also known as the Archeological Recovery Act or the Moss-Bennett bill
  - Required Federal agencies to preserve "historical and archeological data (including relics and specimens) which might otherwise be irreparably lost or destroyed as the result of...any alteration of the terrain caused as a result of any Federal construction project of federally licensed activity or program (Section 1)."
- Archaeological Resources Protection Act of 1979 (ARPA)
  - Replaced the Antiquities Act of 1906.
  - Outlined legal penalties that can be enforced on violators (such as looters).
- Native American Graves Protection and Repatriation Act of 1990 (NAGPRA)
  - Outlines treatment of cultural items, with which they can show a relationship of lineal descent or cultural affiliation.
  - Affects federally funded institutions.
  - Provides greater protection for Native American burial sites and more careful control over the removal of Native American human remains, funerary objects, sacred objects, and items of cultural patrimony. Excavation or removal of any such items also must be done under procedures required by ARPA.
  - Encourages the in situ preservation of archaeological sites, or at least the portions of them that contain burials or other kinds of cultural items.
  - Affects previously acquired artifacts.
  - Continues to be amended
- National Register of Historic Places
  - To be listed, site must meet at least one of four criteria:
    - That are associated with events that have made a significant contribution to the broad patterns of our history
    - That are associated with the lives of significant persons in our past
    - That embody the distinctive characteristics of a type, period, or method of construction, or that represent the work of a master, or that possess high artistic values, or that represent a significant and distinguishable entity whose components may lack individual distinction
    - That have yielded or may be likely to yield, information important in history or prehistory.
  - Benefits of being listed:
    - Entered into a National Database that is easily searchable by the public
    - Encourages preservation and gain opportunities for specific grants, tax credits, preservation easements, and safety code alternatives
    - Get additional resources for care and maintenance of property
    - Get a bronze plaque to distinguish property as being part of the Register of Historic Places

=== China ===
- Regulation on protection for the Great Wall (2006)
  - Prohibits vandalism or removal of any earth or bricks from the site. Those who do not comply are subject to fines.

=== Turkey ===
- Regulation on the Classification, Registration, and Admission to the Museums of the Movable Cultural and Natural Assets Requiring Preservation (2009)
  - Details how museums should classify and register objects of moveable culture when adding to their collections.

=== Australia ===
- Protection of Movable Cultural Heritage Act (1986)
  - Ensures that all objects of cultural significance remain in Australia. The act also ensures the return of foreign cultural property that was stolen from other countries and imported into Australia.

=== Egypt ===
- Law on the Protection of Antiquities (1983)
  - All antiquities are property of the state of Egypt and thus protected. Any smuggling or removal of antiquities is prohibited and punishable by fine or imprisonment. Any piece of movable or immovable property should be reported to the state and registered. Failure to register property is also punishable by law.

=== Europe ===
- Convention for the Protection of the Archaeological Heritage of Europe (Valletta, 1992)
  - National policies for the protection of archaeological assets as sources of scientific and documentary evidence, in line with the principles of integrated conservation. Convention sets guidelines for the funding of excavation and research work and publication of research findings. It also deals with public access, in particular to archaeological sites, and educational actions to be undertaken to develop public awareness of the value of the archaeological heritage.
