= Medal of Bravery (Iraq) =

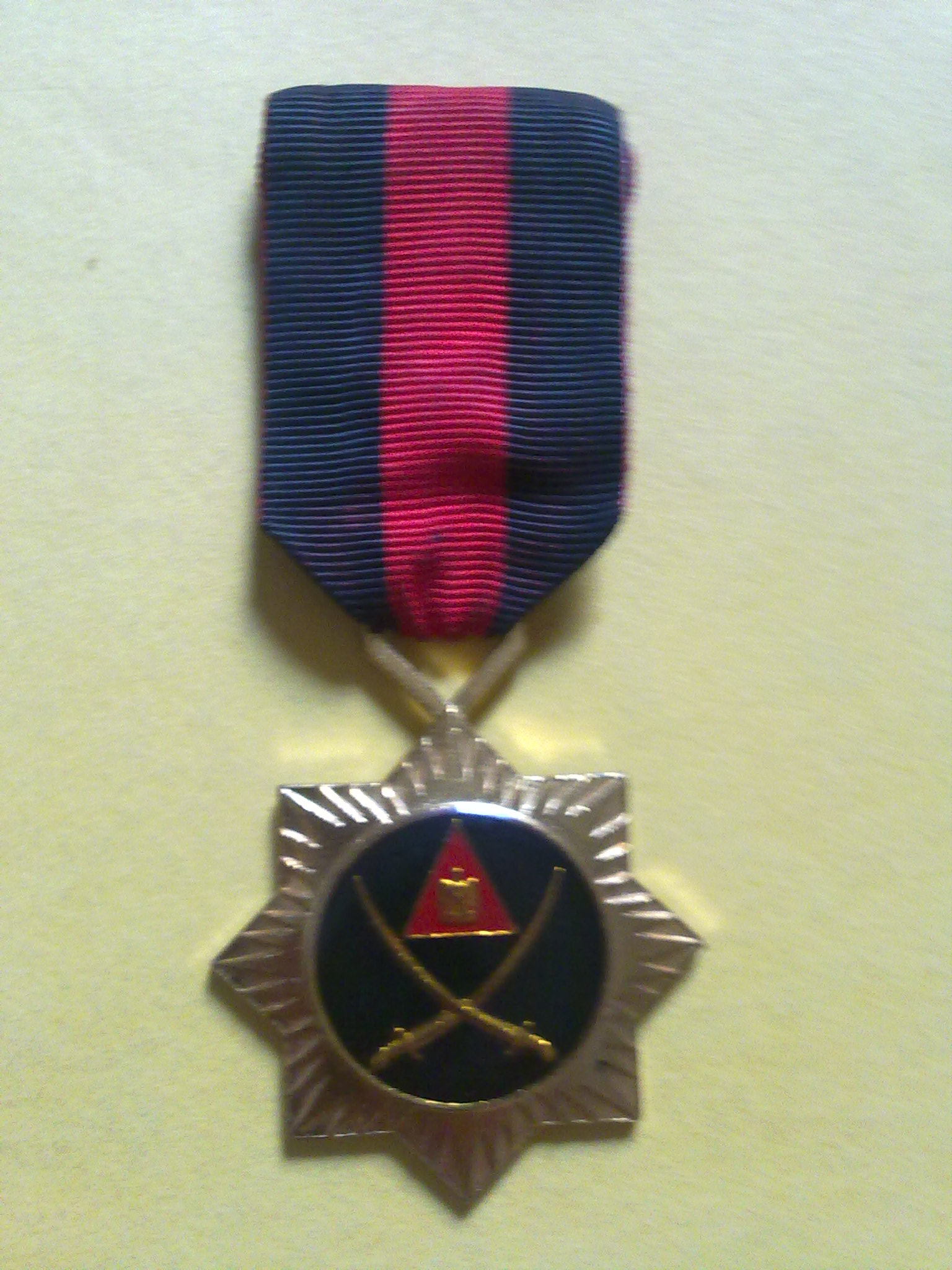
- The Iraqi bravery medal
- Native name: Nut al-Shujat
- Awarded for: Brave acts in war.
- Country: Iraq
- Established: originally established in 1926, established in its current form in 1958.
- The ribbon of the Iraqi Bravery medal

The Medal of Bravery (Arabic: النوط الشجعة, al-Nut al-Shujat) was a medal awarded by the First Republic of Iraq and Ba'athist Iraq to Iraqi military personnel for brave acts in war. It was awarded in many of Iraq's military conflicts.

== History ==
The medal was instituted in 1958, during the rule of Abdul-Karim Qasim, as a replacement for an earlier royal award established in 1926 that was also called the Medal of Bravery and to which the new award bore a great resemblance, namely in the ribbon and its form as a star. However, the old award only possessed seven points compared to the new award's eight and its centre bore the royal crown of the Monarchy.

The medal has changed appearance twice during the republican period, although the shape has remained largely the same since 1958. It changed once in 1963, after the Ramadan Revolution, substituting the Qasimist star of the ousted regime in favour of the Ba'athist Eagle of Saladin. This variant was manufactured by the Swiss firm Hugenin Frères of Le Locle in the Canton of Neuchâtel. The award was again modified in 1990; the medal was now manufactured in Iraq itself, the design was simplified, and the manufacturing used inferior materials and methods due to Iraq's economic problems during and following the Gulf War.

== Appearance ==
The obverse of the award depicted the Iraqi national emblem, set within a red triangle, above crossed sabres, inside a black enamel circle. Outside the circle, the medal possessed eight gilt points and was suspended from a black ribbon with a central red stripe. The reverse was concave; pre-Gulf War examples possess a maker's mark in the form of an elaborate A on the top point of the star, which post-war examples lack.

Several Iraqi medals, namely the Qadisiyyah Medal for the Iran-Iraq War, and the Mother of All Battles Medal for the Gulf War, are identical in form to the bravery medal; the only difference being the ribbons: which were olive grey, with a large black centre stripe, and separated by two rainbow stripes in the case of the Qadisiyyah medal, and three equal red, white, and black stripes, with a thin green stripe which represent the colours of the Iraqi Flag, in the case of the Mother of all Battles medal.
