= Yang Hongxun =

Yang Hongxun (Chinese: 杨鸿勋; 4 December 1931 – 17 April 2016) was a Chinese architect, architectural historian, and archaeologist. He was a professor at the Institute of Archaeology, Chinese Academy of Social Sciences, and a founder of the field of architectural archaeology in China. He published a number of acclaimed books in the fields of architectural history and archaeology of China, and designed the National Museum of Chinese Writing and the Longshan Culture Museum.

== Life and career ==
Yang was born on 4 December 1931 in Li County, Hebei, Republic of China. He graduated from the Department of Architecture of Tsinghua University in 1955, and was assigned to work as an assistant to the renowned scholar Liang Sicheng at the Institute of Civil Engineering and Architecture of the Chinese Academy of Sciences. He helped Liang found the Architectural Theory and History Research Office, which became part of the Institute of Architectural Sciences after 1957.

In 1973, Yang moved to the Institute of Archaeology, Chinese Academy of Social Sciences on the invitation of director Xia Nai. There he established the program for architectural archaeology. He spent the rest of his career at the institute and was later promoted to associate professor and professor. He also taught as an adjunct professor at Fudan University, Tongji University, South China University of Technology, and National Taiwan University.

Yang's research focus was the history and archaeology of architecture. In 2001, his Collection of Papers on Architectural Archaeology (建筑考古学论文集, 1987) was voted by readers of the national academic newspaper China Cultural Relics News (中国文物报) as the best book on archaeology and museology of the 20th century. Another book of his, A Treatise on the Gardens of Jiangnan (江南园林论, 1994), was voted the third best.

Yang was awarded a special pension for distinguished scholars by the State Council of China, and served as an advisor to UNESCO. He was elected a member of the Russian Academy of Architecture and Construction Sciences in 2005.

Yang died on 17 April 2016 in Beijing, aged 84.

== Design works ==
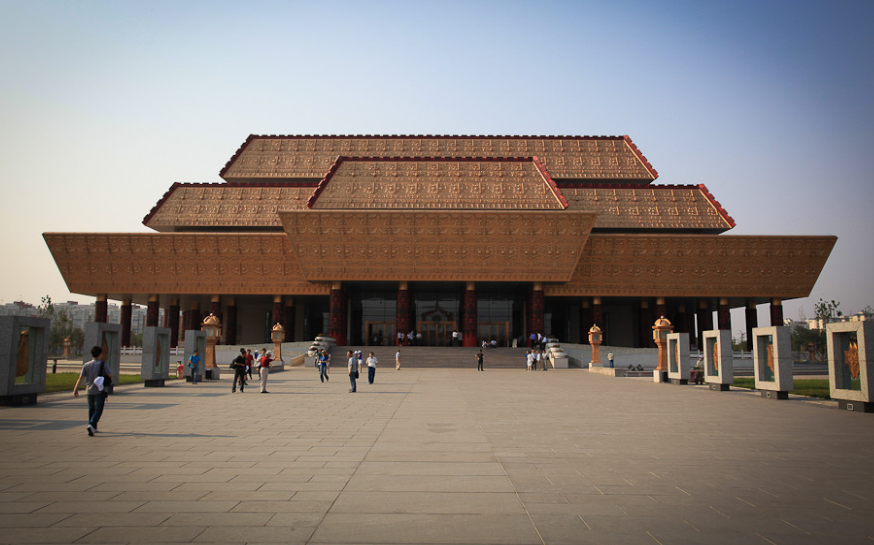
National Museum of Chinese Writing (2009)

Yang designed the National Museum of Chinese Writing, which opened in 2009 in Anyang, Henan, the home of the oracle bones. The museum resembles the Chinese character yong (墉), meaning "city wall", in its ancient pictographic form of the oracle bone script (a square representing walls surrounded by four gateways). However, his design choice has been criticized for being too literal rather than figurative, thus limiting the design solution.

He also designed the Longshan Culture Museum, which opened in 1994 at Chengziya, the type site of the Longshan culture, in Shandong. The museum is in the shape of a black bird, a sacred symbol of the culture.
