= Taosi =

Archaeological site in Xiangfen County, Shanxi, China

- 陶寺 (Chinese)
- Location in north China
- 35°53′26.17″N 111°29′49.82″E
- Cultures: Longshan culture
- Location: China
- Region: Shanxi

History
- Built: c. 2300 BC
- Abandoned: c. 1900 BC

Site notes
- Area: 280 ha (690 acres)

Taosi (Chinese: 陶寺; pinyin: Táosì) is an archaeological site in Xiangfen County, Linfen, southwestern Shanxi province, northern China. Taosi is considered to be part of the late phase of the Longshan culture in southern Shanxi, also known as the Taosi phase (2300 BC to 1900 BC).

== Archaeology ==
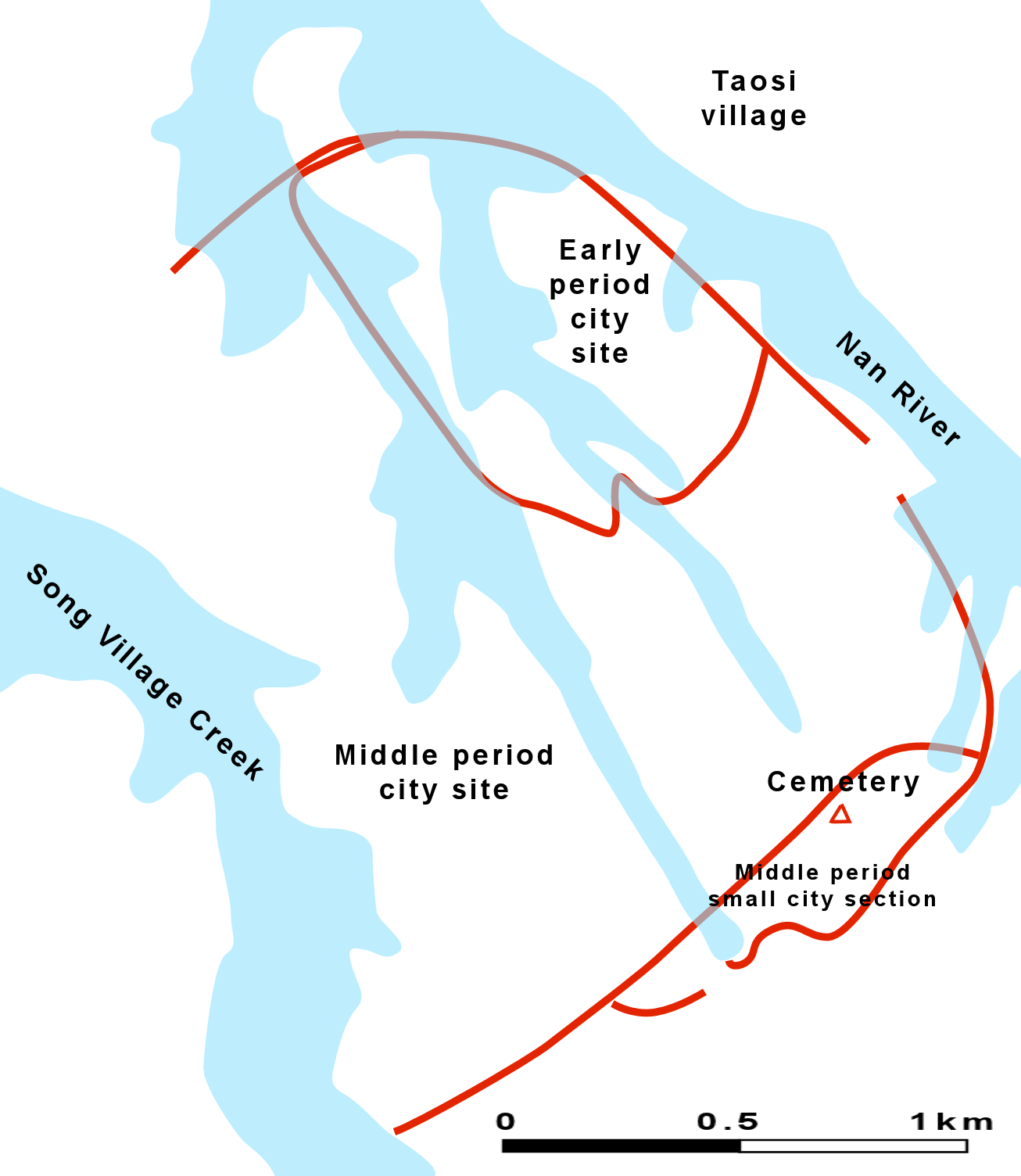
Plan of Taosi, with layout of rammed-earth enclosure

Taosi was surrounded by a gigantic rammed-clay enclosure. This was discovered from 1999 to 2001 by the archaeologists from the Institute of Archaeology, Chinese Academy of Social Sciences; they attributed this wall to the Middle Taosi period (4,100 to 4,000 BP). Rectangular in form with an inner area of 280 ha.

An internal rammed-earth wall separated the residential and ceremonial areas of the elite from the areas inhabited by commoners, signifying the development of a stratified society.

The Huaxia settlement outgrew the perimeter of the wall. The settlement is the largest Longshan site discovered in the Linfen basin of the Yellow River, and is possibly a regional center. The settlement represents the most politically organized system on the Central Plains at the time. The polities in the Taosi site are considered an advanced chiefdom, but may not have developed into a higher political organization. It was not the Taosi polities but the less socially complex Central Plains Longshan sites, the scattered, multi-system competing systems that gave rise to early states in this region.

== Ancient observatory ==
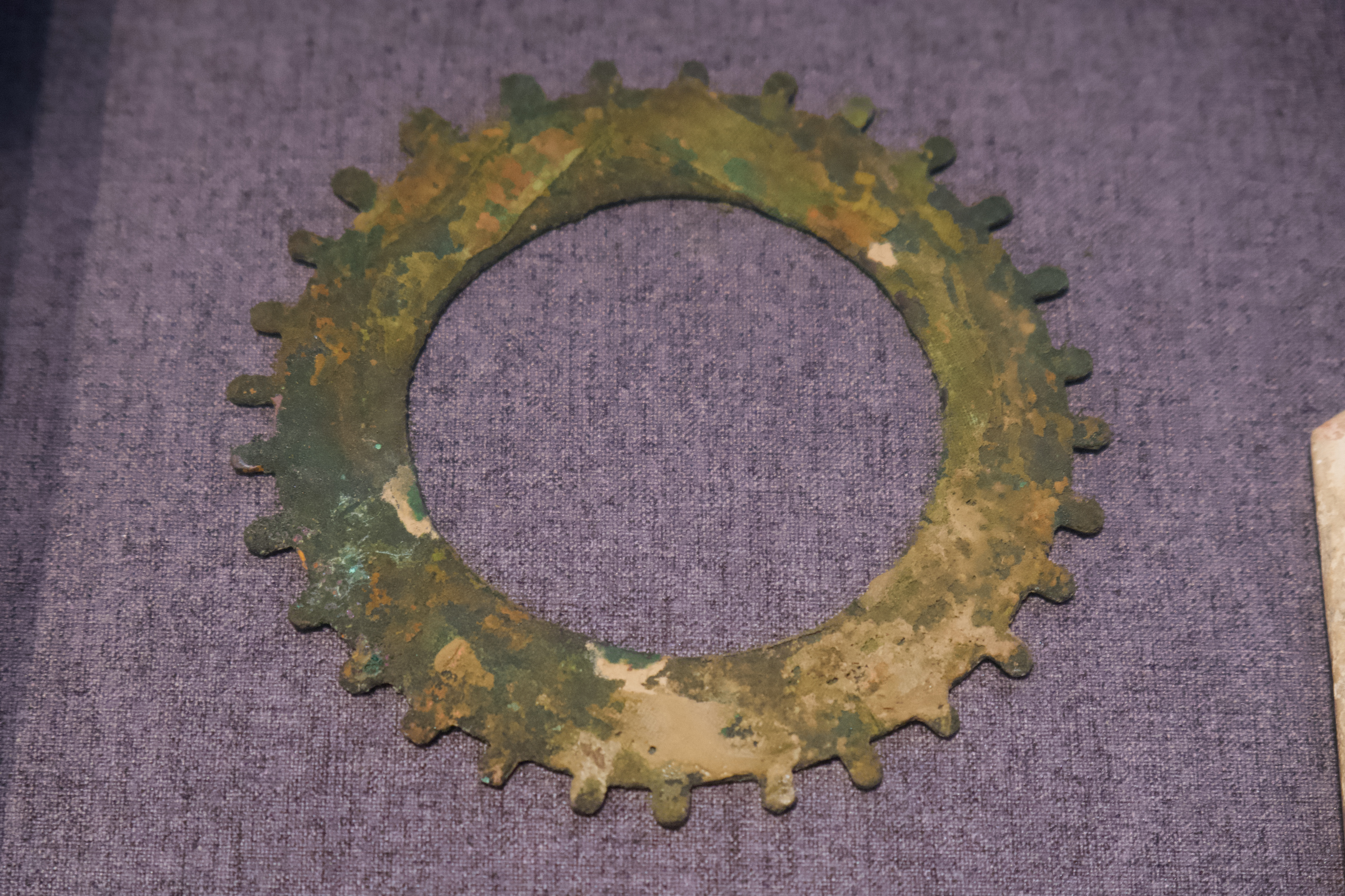
Bronze ring with bumps

An astronomical observatory was also partially preserved at Taosi, the oldest in East Asia.

This was discovered in 2003-2004. Archaeologists unearthed a Middle Taosi period semi-circular foundation just beside the southern wall of the Middle Taosi enclosure, which could have been used for calendrical observations. The structure consists of an outer semi-ring-shaped path, and a semi-circular rammed-earth platform with a diameter of about 60 m. The platform is 42m in diameter and over 1000 sq m in area, and can be reconstructed as a three-level altar.

The most important construction preserved was a semi-circular structure of rammed earth, facing East. Depending on the interpretation, this was (a) a tall wall pierced with a number of irregularly spaced and separated slots, or (b) a series of pillars, separated by small somewhat irregular vertical spaces. This wall or line of pillars was linked to a central position from which observations could be made by peering through the empty spaces. Standing in the center of the altar and looking out, one finds that most of slots are oriented toward a given point on the Chongfen Mountain to the East.

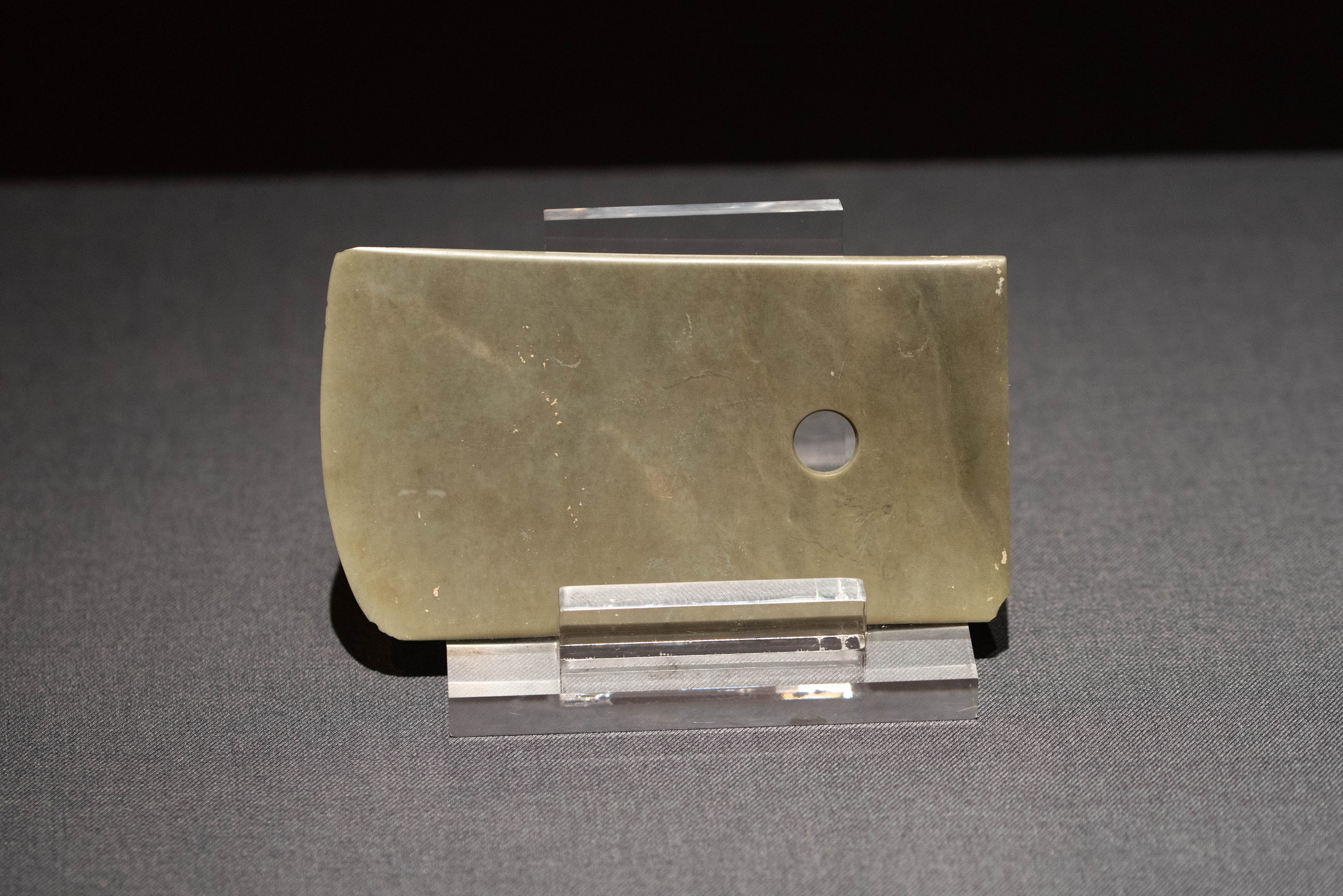
Jade yue (ritual axe)

In ancient times, sunrises related to the winter and summer solstices might have been visible through different slots. This means these slots might share a function similar to the Thirteen Towers of the Chankillo Observatory, having been intentionally constructed for calendrical observation of the sunrise on particular given days, in order to follow the local solar calendar, which would have been crucial for rituals and also for the practice of agriculture at that time.

A painted pole discovered in a tomb at the prehistoric site dating from perhaps 2000 or 2300 BCE is probably the oldest gnomon known in China. From ancient texts, we know that the gnomon was widely used in ancient China from the second century BC onward in order determine the changes in seasons, and to determine positional orientation, including geographical latitudes. The ancient Chinese used shadow measurements for creating calendars that are mentioned in several ancient texts. According to the collection of Zhou Chinese poetic anthologies Classic of Poetry, one of the distant ancestors of King Wen of the Zhou dynasty used to measure gnomon shadow lengths to determine orientation around the 14th-century BC.

In a tomb at the site, a copper object resembling a gear was also discovered. This is usually identified as a bracelet, but does not look comfortable or attractive (see photograph). However, as a gear it would make sense. All lunar months always have an integer-dependent number of days, since the half-days of lunar months do not exist in practice. The 29 open spaces might match the 29 days of some lunar months. Most lunar months have 30 days, and thus the 29 day lunar months would have been exceptional, requiring special treatment. One could therefore link this to the observatory as well, assuming that it was also a calendrical device.

According to the astronomical historian David W. Pankenier, even though the structure was made to measure the lunar months, it was capable of measuring an approximation of the solar year, making it a lunar–solar combined calendar with the intercalary thirteenth month inserted in the regular year circles. Pankenier conjectures that the density of astronomical information associated with such a calendar provides contextual motivation for the development of an early writing system, as the quantity of data would have been difficult to commit to memory. He thus proposes that "it was calendrical astronomy that lent impetus to the invention of writing in China."

== Necropolis ==
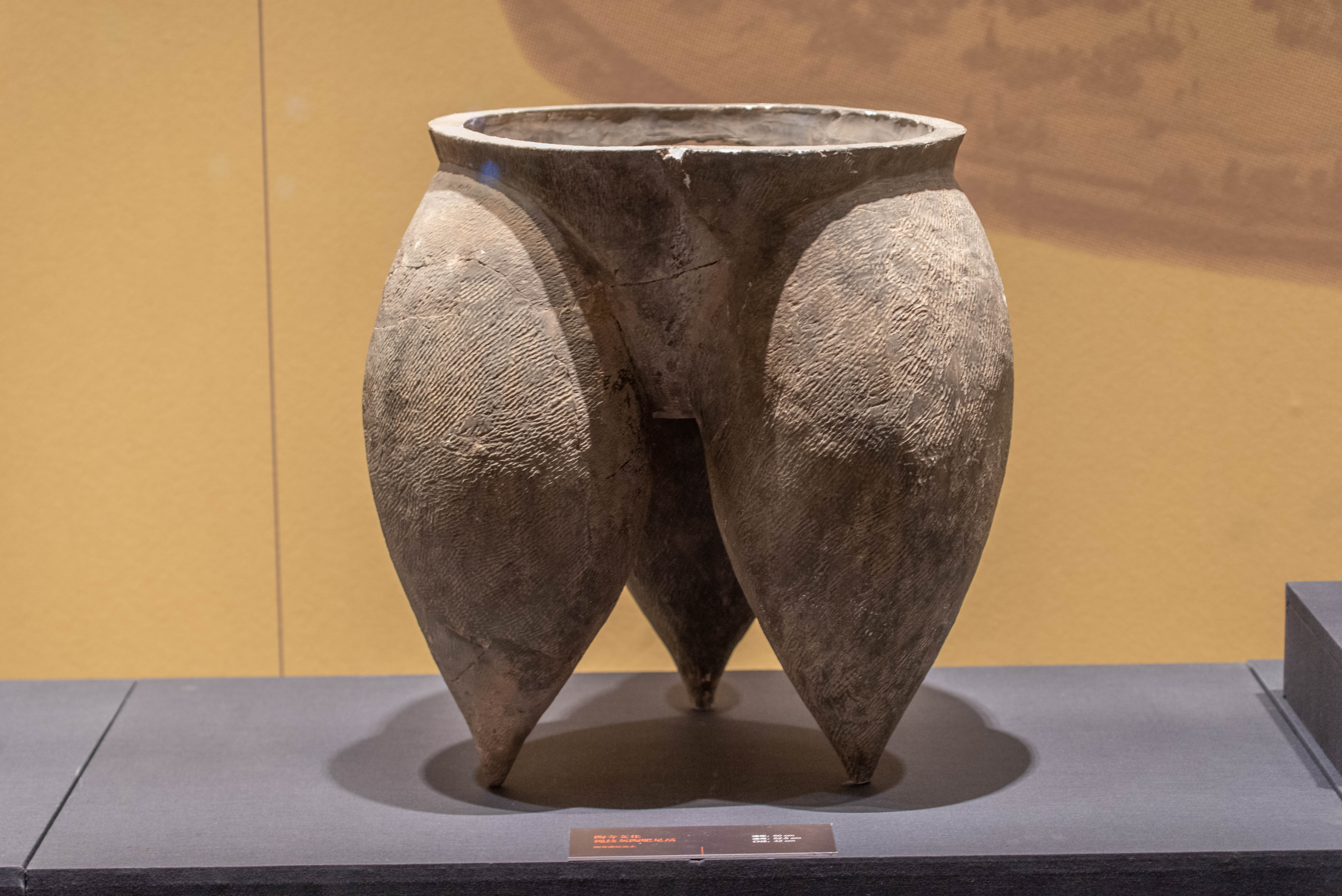
Tripod vessel

The cemetery of Taosi covered an area of 30,000 square meters (3ha) at its height.

The cemetery contained over 1,500 burials. The burials at Taosi were highly stratified (the most stratified of Longshan sites), with burial wealth concentrated in the graves of a few males (nine large graves). The largest graves were placed in separated rooms with murals, had a large cache of grave goods (some with over 200 objects, including jades, copper bells, wooden and crocodile skin musical instruments); middle-size graves featured painted wooden coffins and luxury objects; most of the small graves did not have grave goods.

== Instruments ==
Musical instruments have been unearthed at Taosi, including drums, chimes, and a jaw harp. A single bronze bell was also found at a Taosi grave.

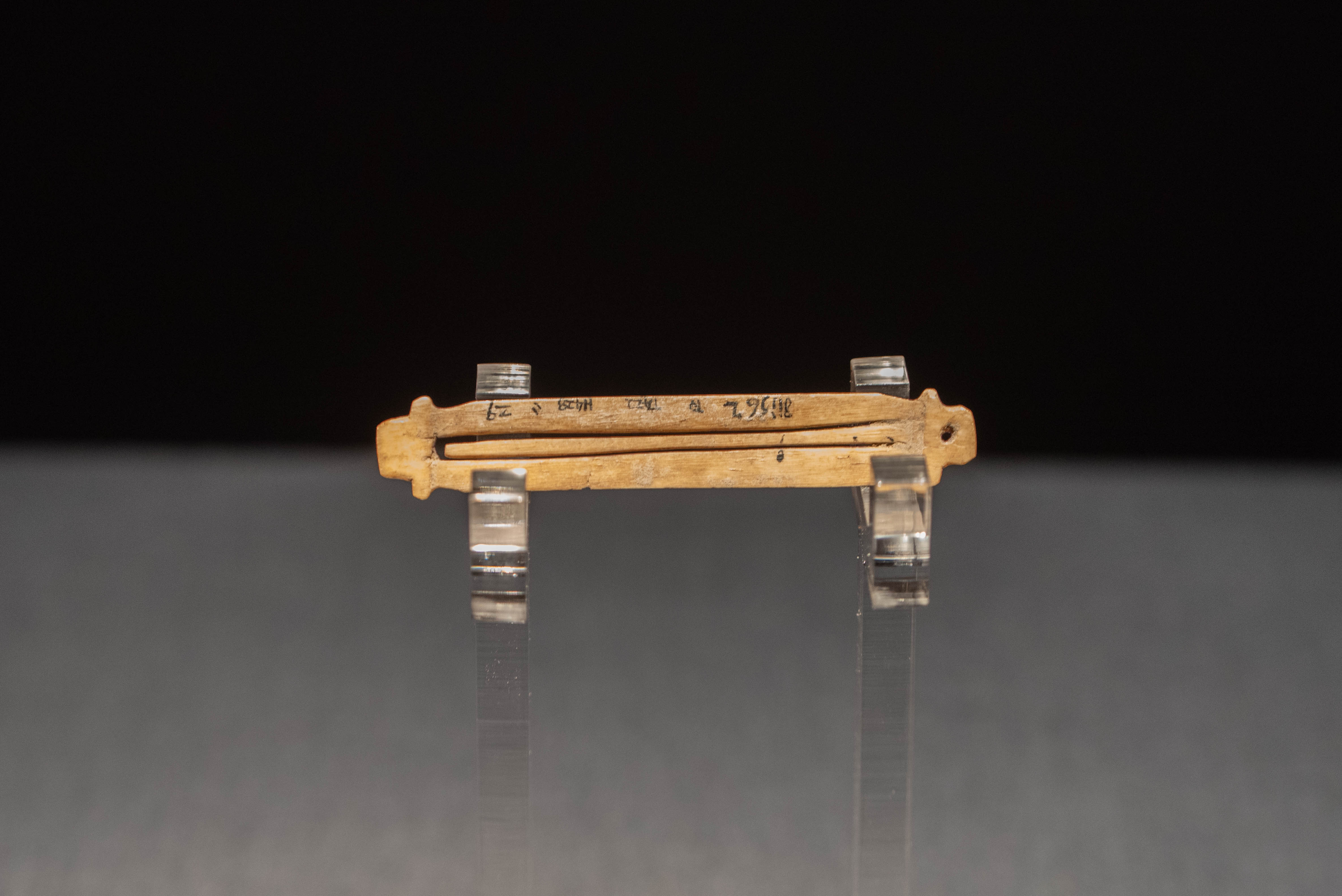
Kouxian (jaw harp)

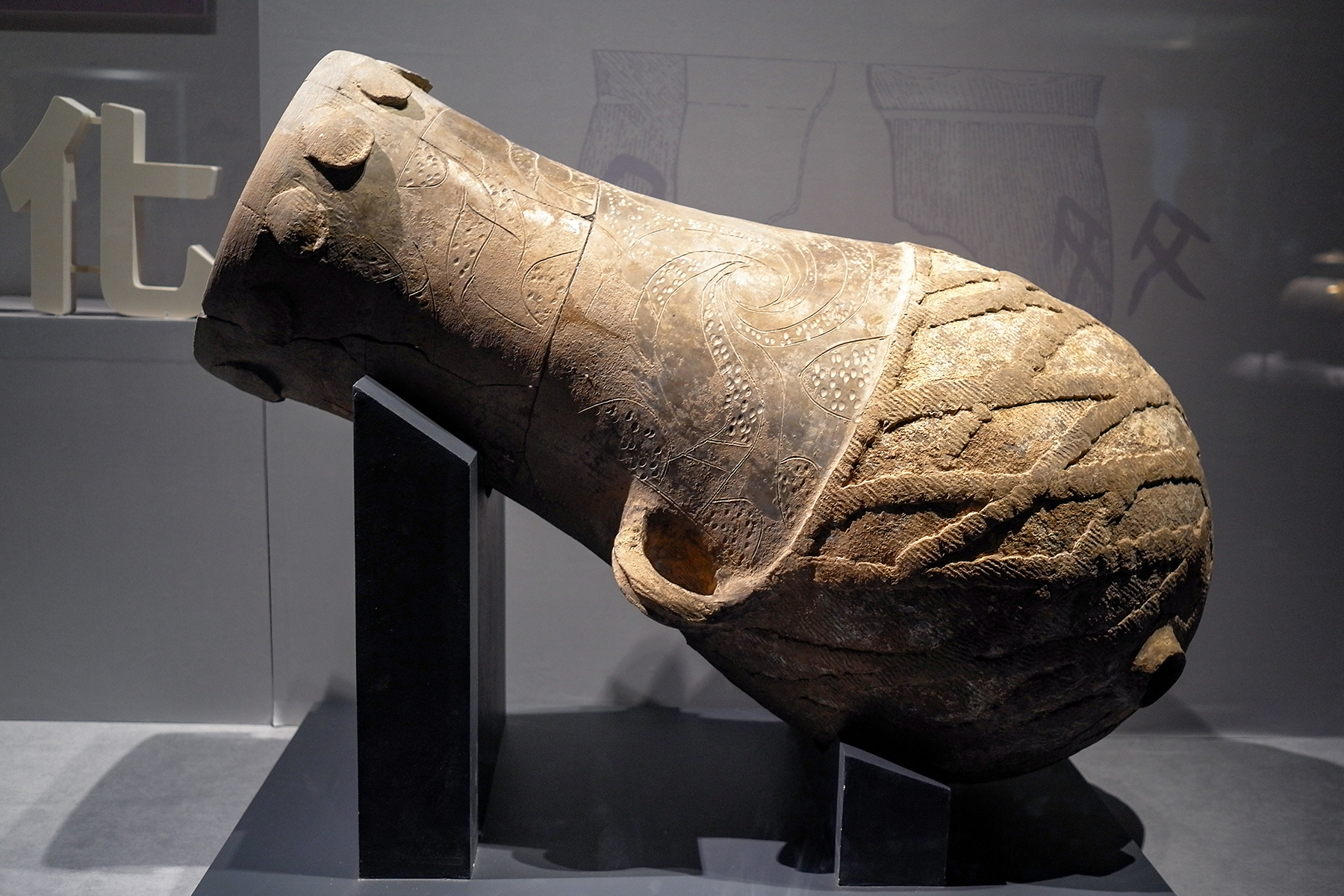
Pottery drum

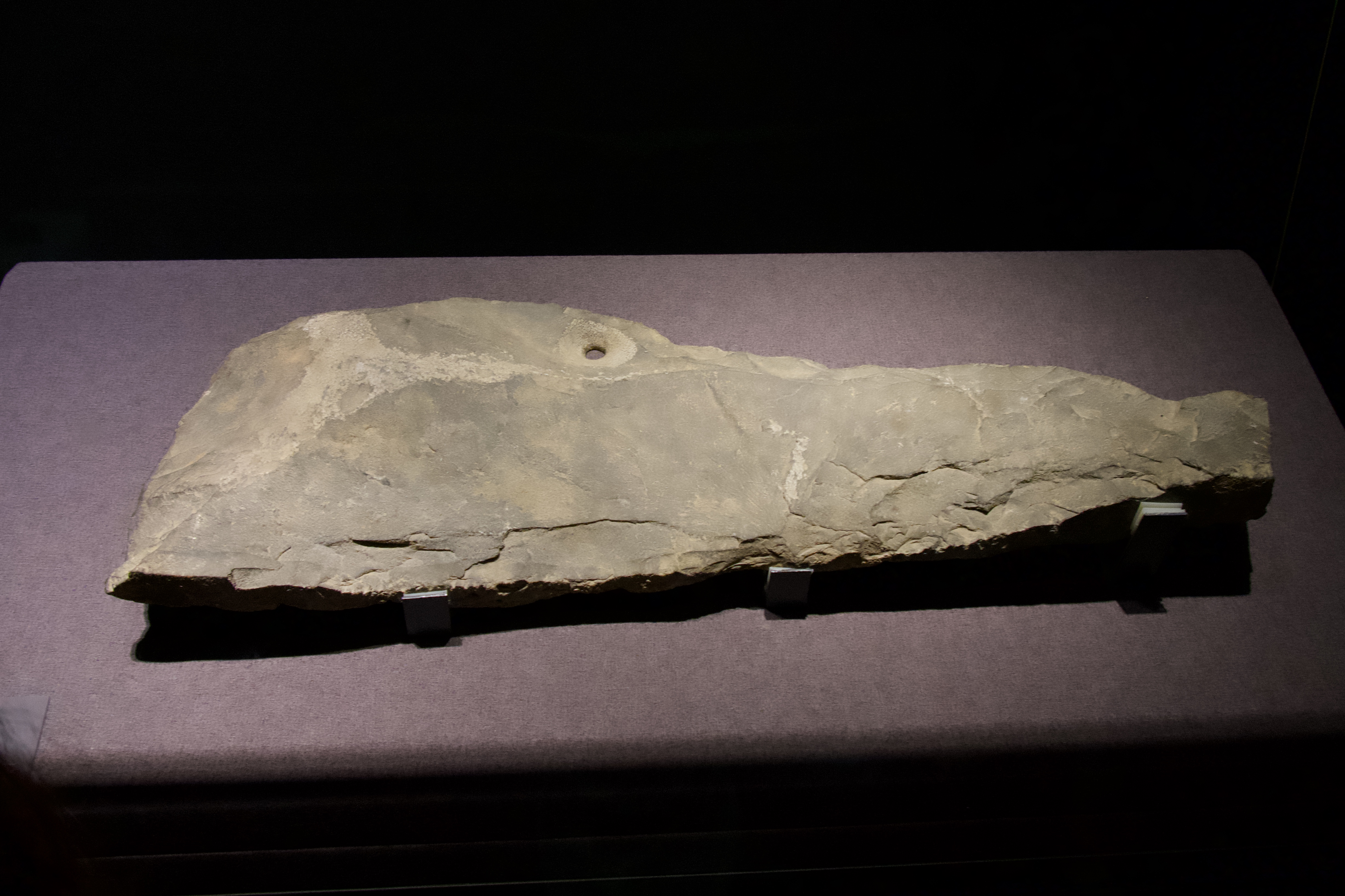
Stone chime

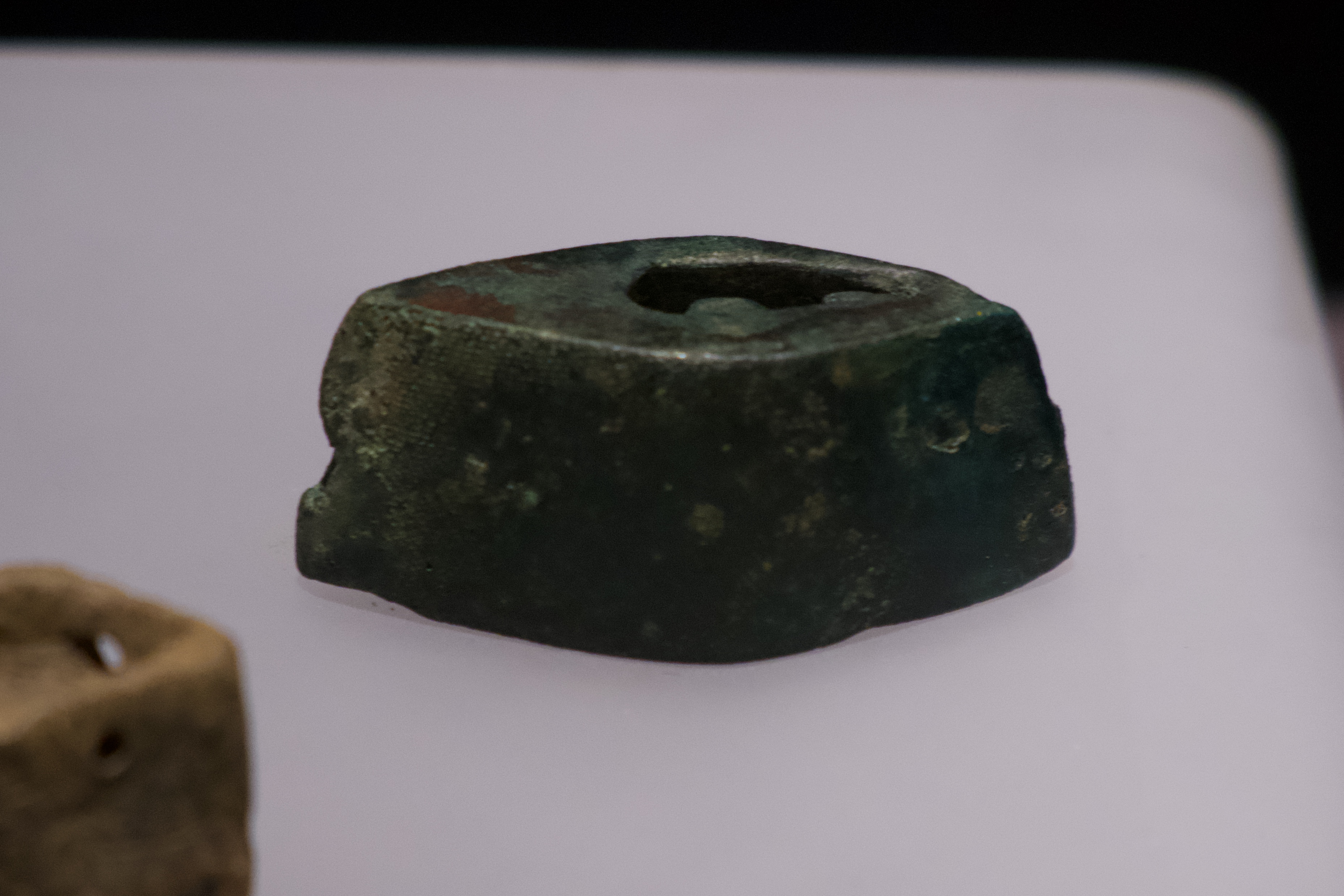
Bronze bell

== Emperor Yao connection ==
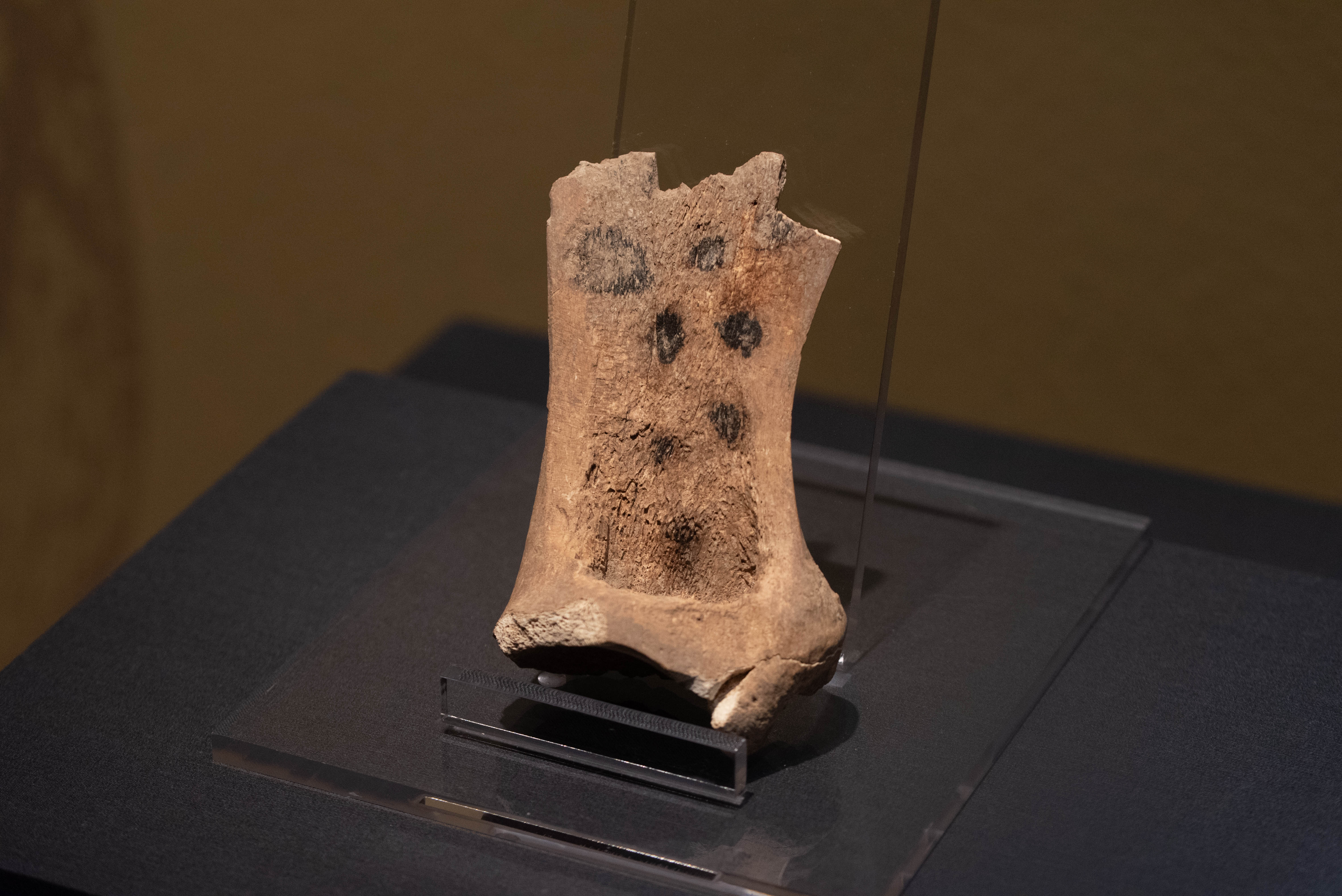
Bone used for scapulimancy

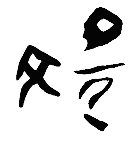
Markings from the Taosi site

Several Chinese archaeologists postulate that Taosi was the site where the state of Tang (有唐) was established by Emperor Yao (traditionally c. 2356–2255 BC), who later instituted Taosi as the capital.

In Chinese classic documents Yao Dian (Document of Yao) in Shang Shu (Book of Ancient Time), and Wudibenji (Records for the Five Kings) in Shiji (Historic Records), Emperor Yao assigned astronomic officers to observe celestial phenomena, including time and position of sunrise, sunset, and stars in culmination, in order to systematically establish a lunisolar calendar with 366 days a year with leap month. The observatory found at Taosi coincides with these records. It is theorized that the city collapsed with a rebellion against the ruling class.

== Gallery ==
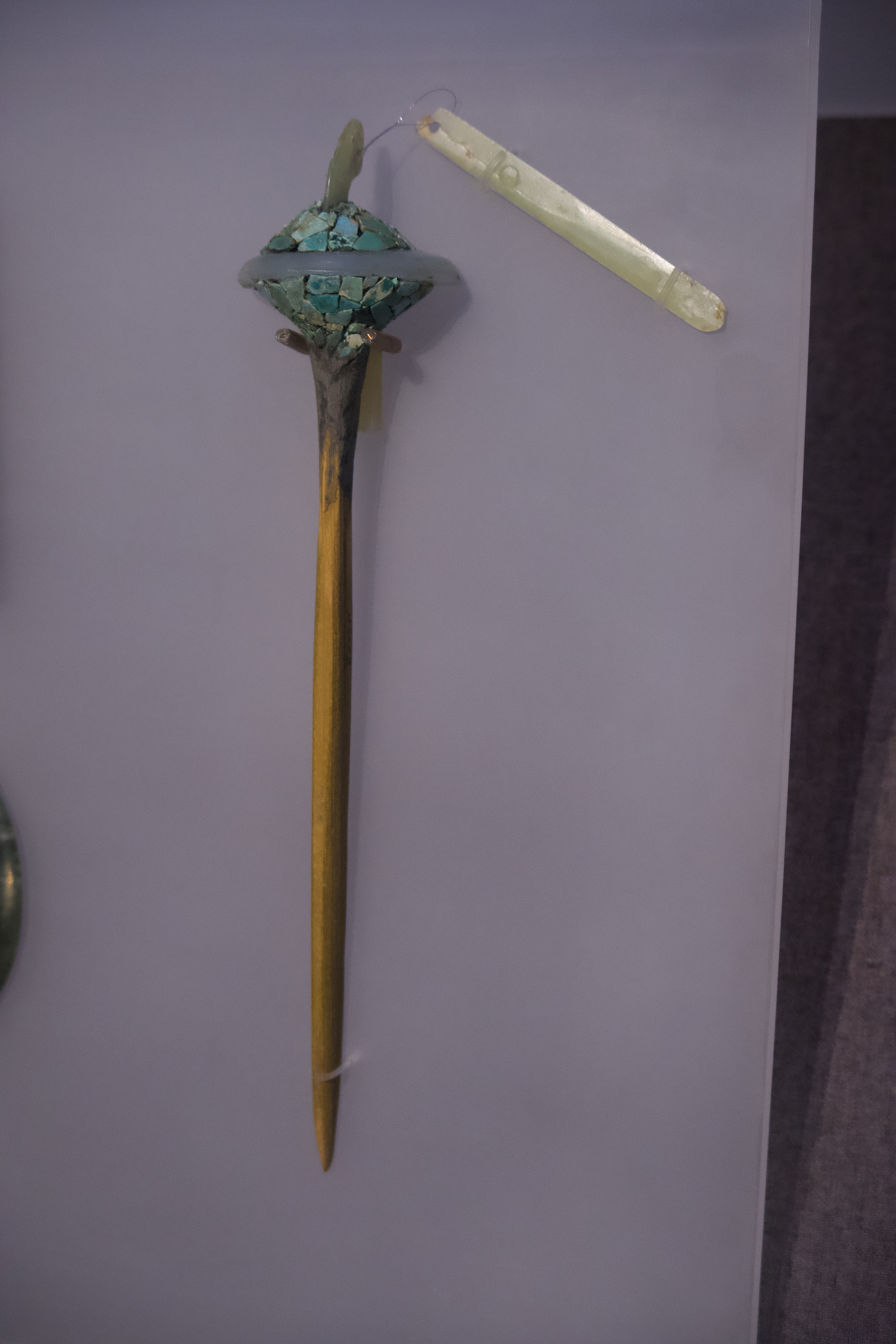
Bone hairpin with turquoise inlays

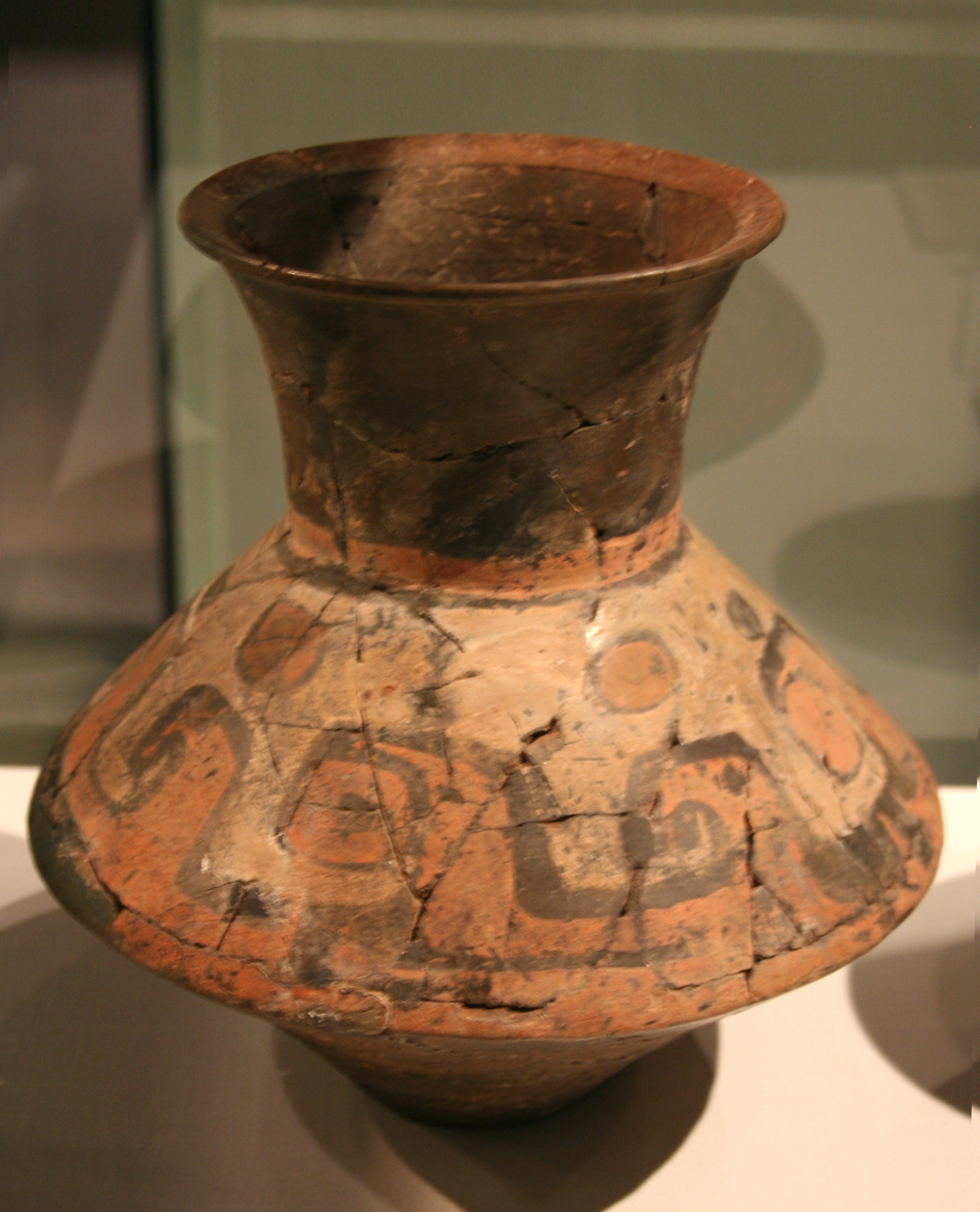
Painted vessel, 2300-2100 BC

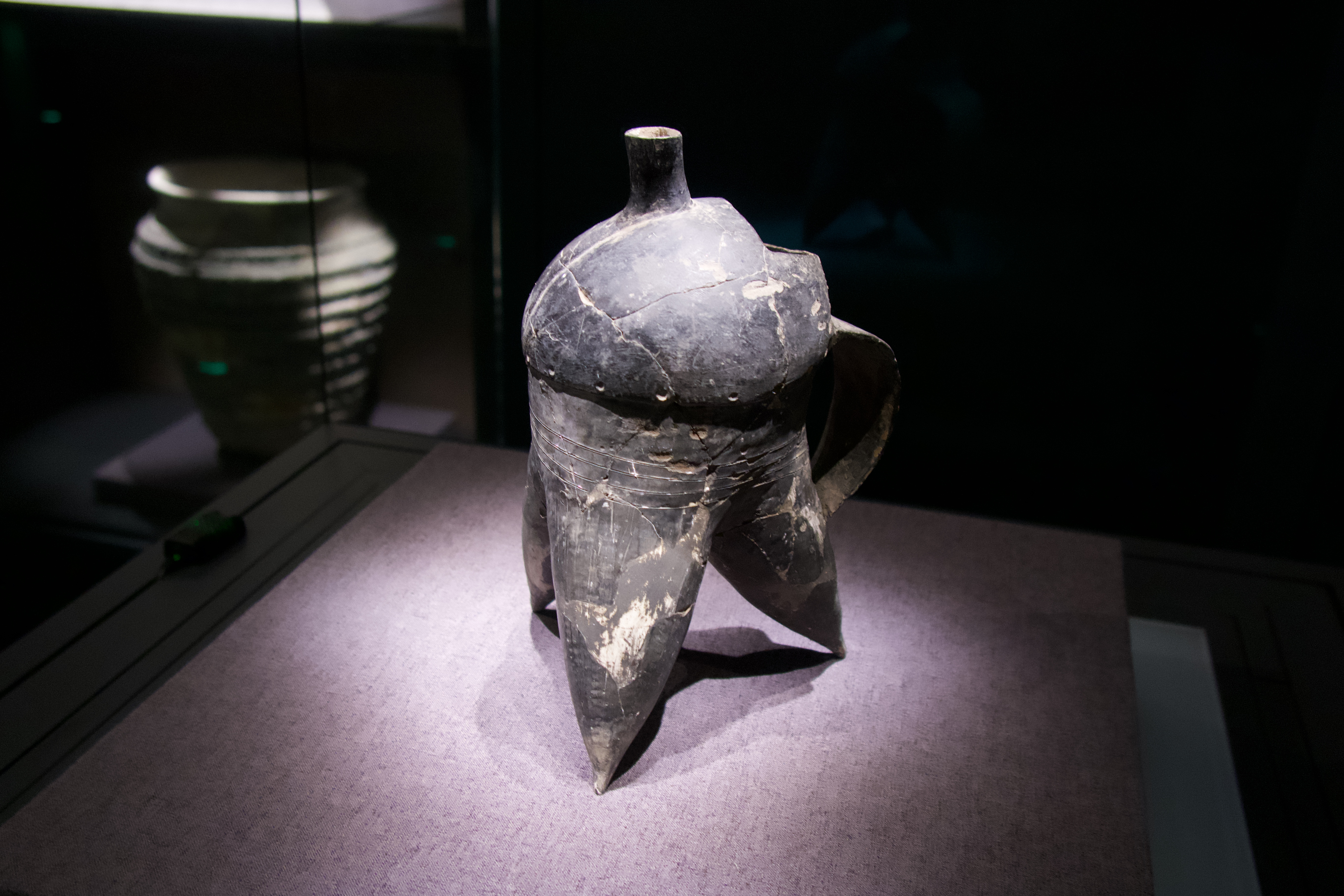
Black tripod vessel

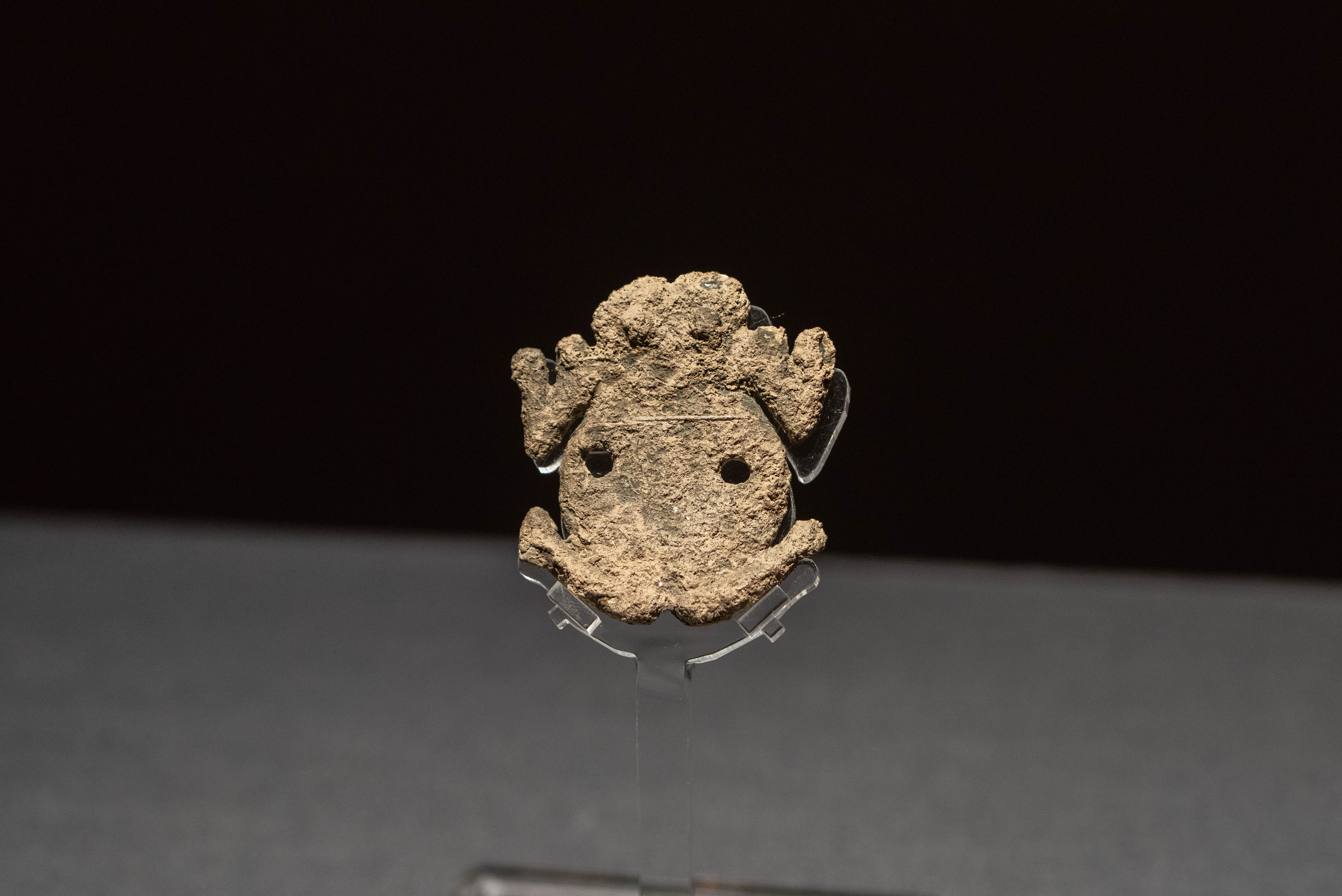
Small bronze toad

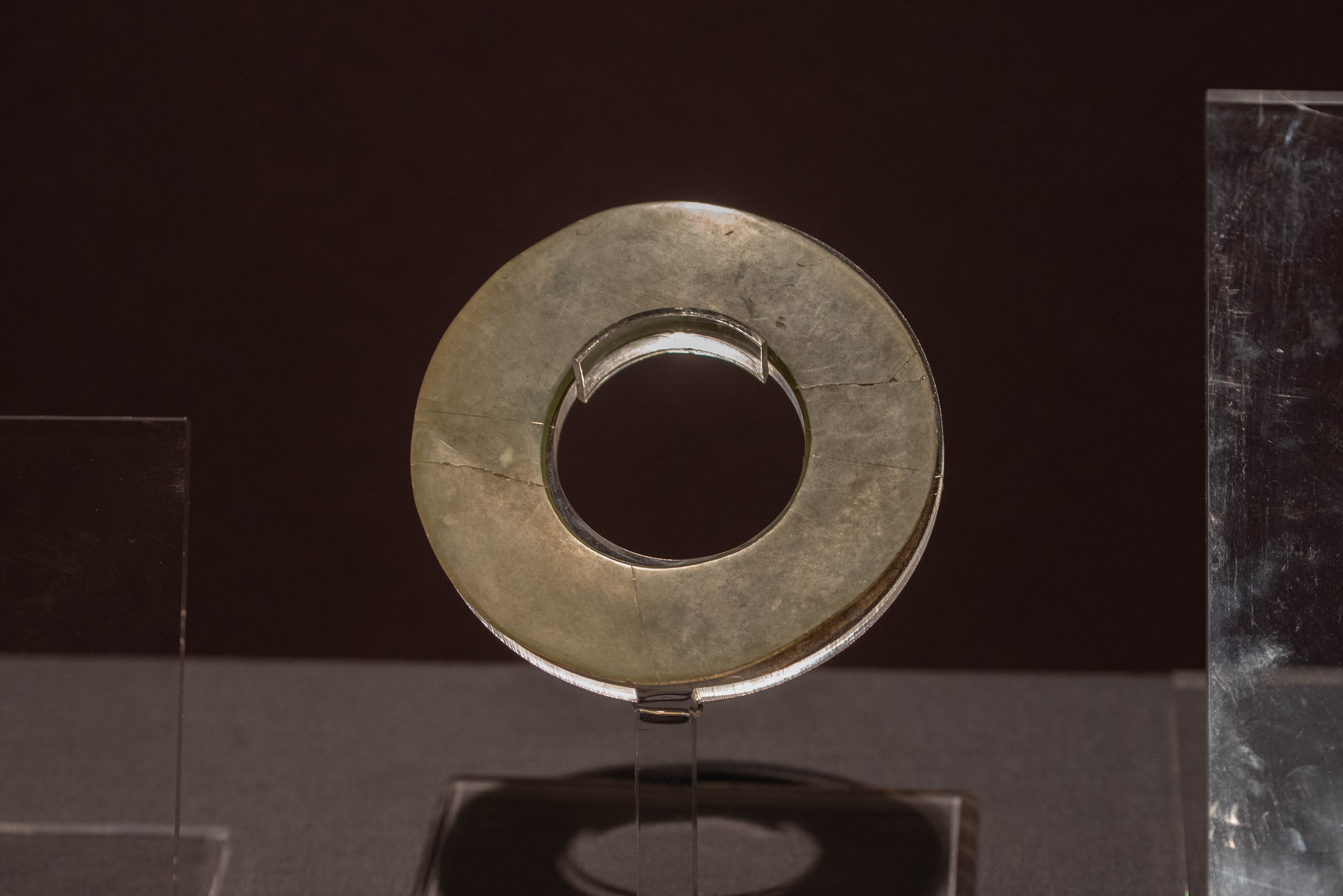
Jade bi disk
