= Yueshi culture =

Archaeological culture in China

- Geographical range: Shandong
- Period: late Neolithic to early Bronze Age
- Dates: c. 1900 – c. 1500 BC
- Preceded by: Longshan culture
- Followed by: Erligang culture

Chinese name
- Simplified Chinese: 岳石文化
Transcriptions
Standard Mandarin
- Hanyu Pinyin: Yuèshí wénhuà

The Yueshi culture (Chinese: 岳石文化) was an archaeological culture in the Shandong region of eastern China, dated from 1900 to 1500 BC. It spanned the period from the Late Neolithic to the early Bronze Age. In the Shandong area, it followed the Longshan culture period (c. 2600–1900 BC) and was later replaced by the Erligang culture (identified with the historical Shang dynasty).

== Geographical range ==
Yueshi culture sites have been found in Shandong, eastern Henan, and north Jiangsu province. It is named after the type site at Dongyueshi (East Yueshi) Village in Pingdu, Shandong. More than 340 Yueshi sites have been identified in Shandong, but this was still a considerable decline from the previous Shandong Longshan culture.

Yueshi was contemporary with the Erlitou culture and the early Erligang culture, both located to its west. The Tai-Yi Mountains (泰沂山脉) region in central Shandong is the core area of Yueshi, but as the Erligang state (commonly identified with the early Shang dynasty) expanded, Yueshi declined and retreated to the Shandong Peninsula in the east.

In the Shandong area, Daxinzhuang in Jinan and Qianzhangda in Tengzhou were the first regional centers established by the Erligang culture. The ruling elites apparently consisted of the Erligang peoples, which eventually came to dominate the area culturally. In the Daxinzhuang area, the early Shang and Yueshi pottery traditions coexisted in the same archaeological contexts, suggesting that these two cultures were living side by side.

The Panmiao (潘庙) site in Shangqiu, eastern Henan has a Yueshi culture component dating to the early Bronze Age period (c. 1900–1450 BC). Prior to that, there was Longshan period occupation in this area.

== Characteristics ==
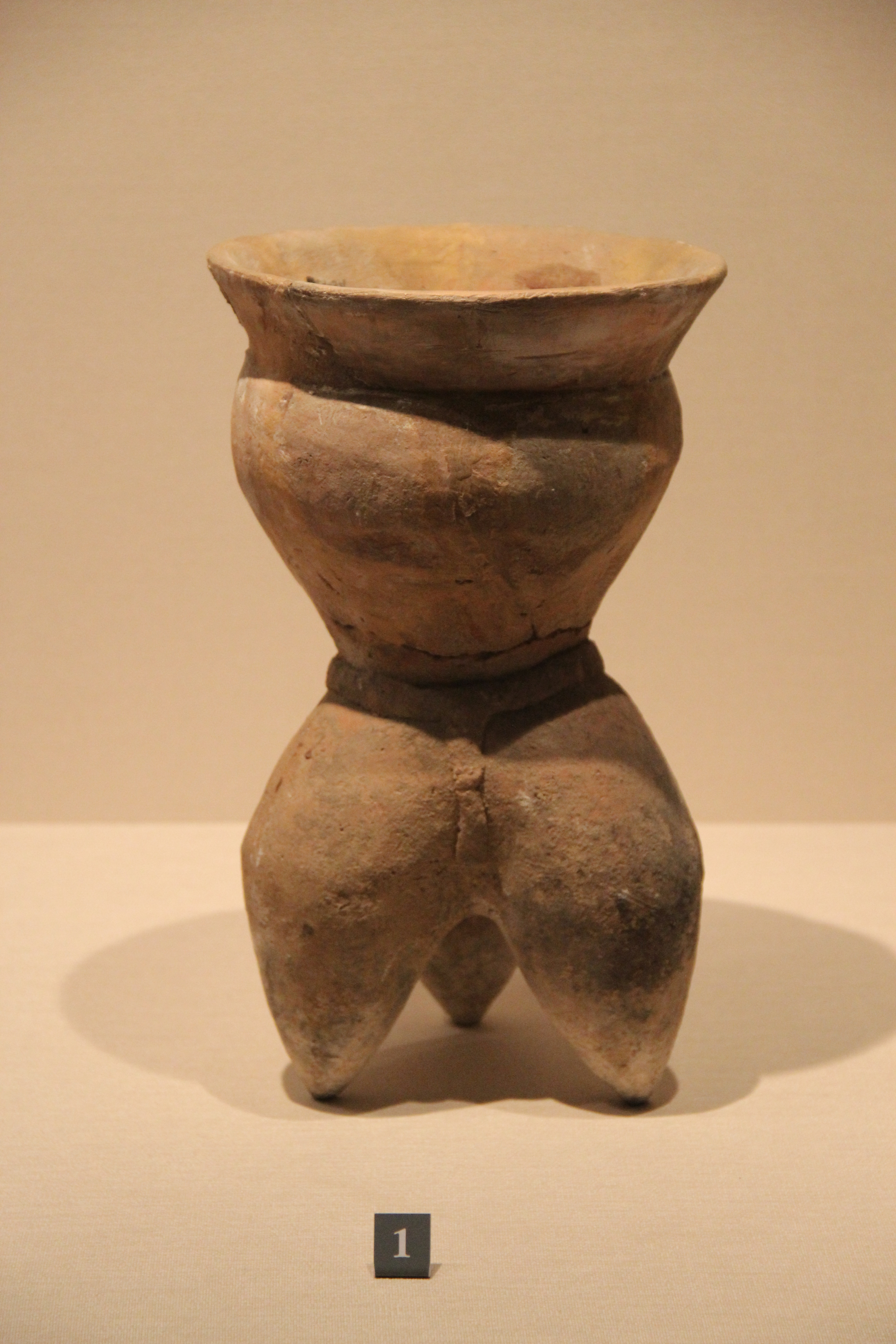
Yueshi Culture pottery

Yueshi culture saw a relative decline of cultural development. Groups of settlements were dissolved and the highly developed pottery technology of the Shandong Longshan culture was lost. Yueshi style of ding-dou type vessels were also present in the Longshan culture, but many other vessel types of these cultures are different. The bronze finds of the Yueshi mostly consist of small, portable items. Bronze vessels are not found. Thus, the deterioration of Yueshi ceramics cannot be explained by the wider use of bronze.

Yueshi culture could be compared to the contemporaneous Lower Xiajiadian culture in Liaoning, the Shuangtuozi culture of the Liaodong Peninsula, and the Dianjiangtai culture in Rongyang, Henan Province.

== Agriculture ==
Yueshi culture shows a decline in the proportion of rice among the cultivated crops, in comparison with earlier cultures of the Lower Yellow River. Stone harvesting knives, in particular straight-blade lunate knives, are prominent in Yueshi culture.

== Identification with the Dongyi ==
In the early 11th century BC, oracle bone inscriptions refer to campaigns by the late Shang king Di Yi against the Rénfāng (人方), a group occupying the area of southern Shandong and northern Jiangsu. Scholars often identify the Renfang with the Dongyi ("Eastern barbarians") mentioned in later Zhou dynasty documents, and thus many Chinese archaeologists apply the historical name "Dongyi" to the archaeological Yueshi culture. Other scholars, such as Fang Hui, consider this identification problematic because of the high frequency of migrations in prehistoric populations of the region.

== See also ==
- Chengziya
- Lower Xiajiadian culture
- Xia dynasty
- Zhukaigou culture
