= Chengziya =

Archaeological site in China

Coordinates: 36°44′8.88″N 117°21′14.94″E

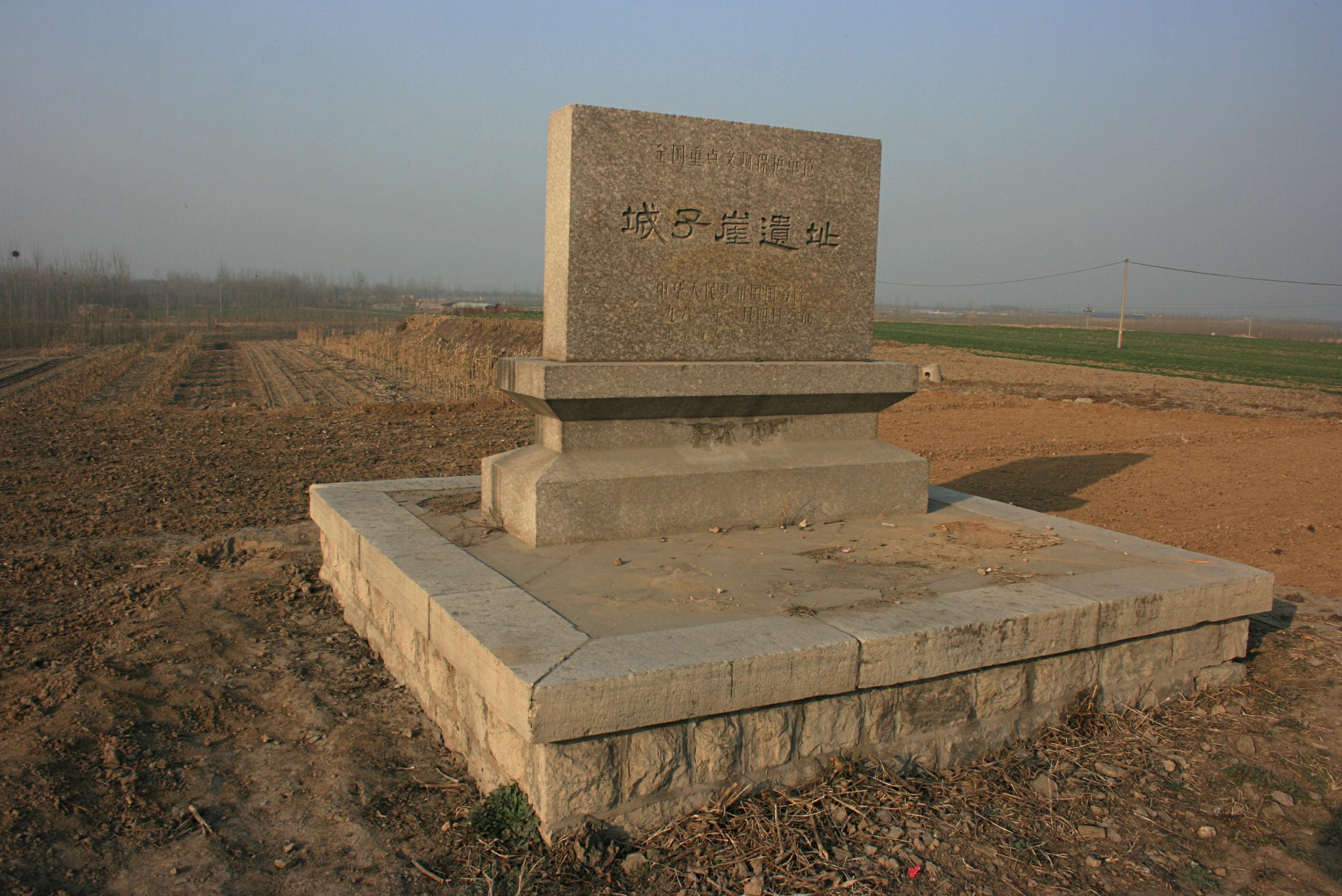
- Roadside marker of the site
- Chinese: 城子崖
Transcriptions
Standard Mandarin
- Hanyu Pinyin: Chéngzǐyá
- Wade–Giles: Ch'eng^{2}-tzu^{3}-ya^{2}

Chengziya, also spelled Chengziyai, is a Chinese archaeological site and the location of the first discovery of the Neolithic Longshan culture in 1928. The discovery of the Longshan culture at Chengziya was a significant step towards understanding the origins of Chinese civilization. To date, Chengziya is the second largest known prehistorical settlement after Shimao. The site is located in Shandong province, about 25 kilometres (16 mi) to the east of the provincial capital Jinan. It is protected and made accessible by the Chengziya Ruins Museum (Chinese: 城子崖遗址博物馆; pinyin: Chéngzǐyá Yízhǐ Bówùguǎn).

== Location ==
Chengziya is located about 1 kilometre (0.62 mi) west of Longshan Town (Chinese: 龙山镇; pinyin: Lóngshān Zhèn) under the administration of Zhangqiu City and about 25 kilometres (16 mi) east of the provincial capital of Jinan. The site is located immediately to the north of provincial road S102 and less than 1 kilometre (0.62 mi) to the south of the Dragon Lake. Other landmarks in the area are Dongping Mausoleum (less than 2 kilometres (1.2 mi) to the east) and the ruins of the old city wall.

== Neolithic settlement ==
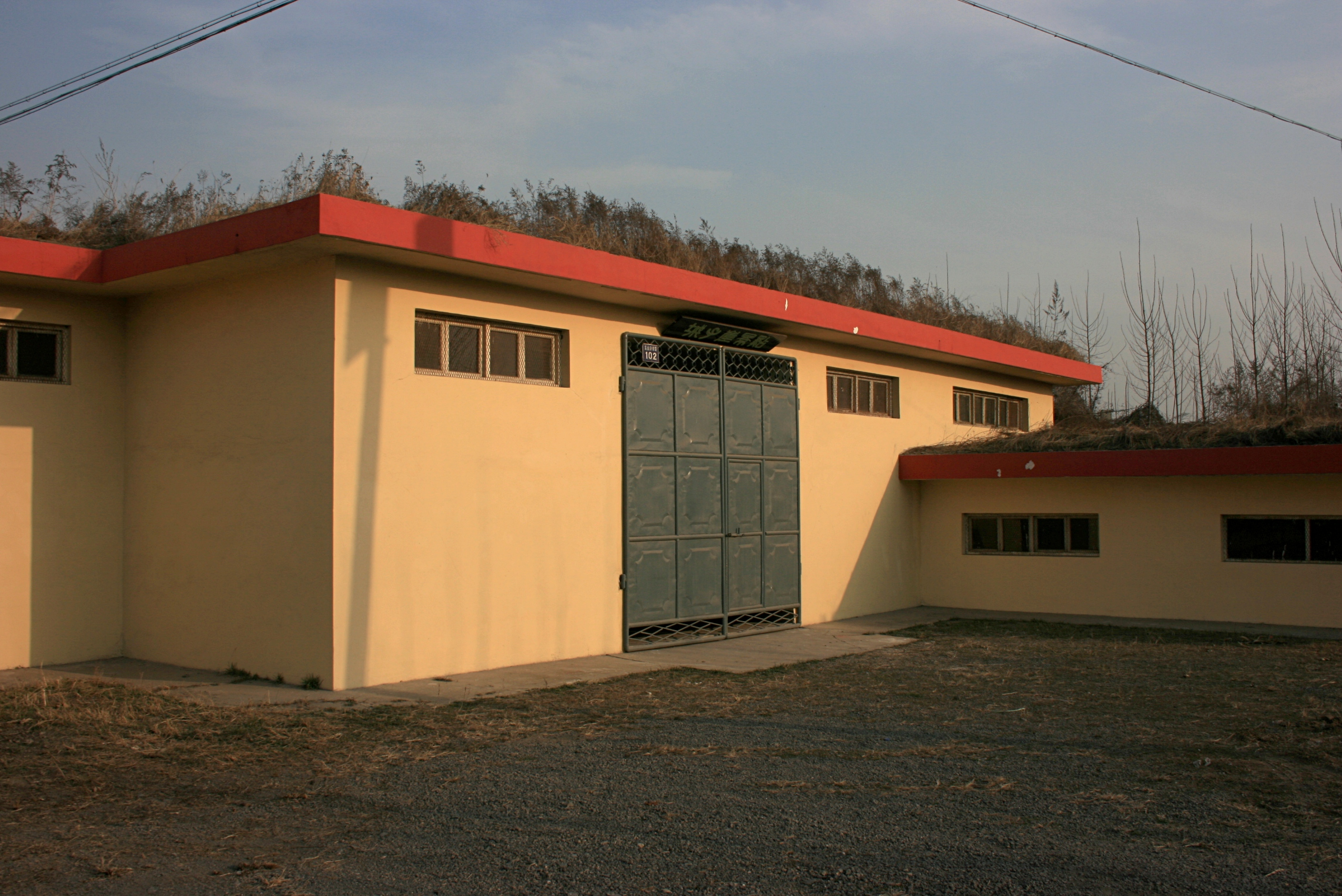
Building protecting the excavation site

The ancient settlement of Chengziya was constructed around 2600 BC and was located on a tableland near the old Guanlu and Wuyuan rivers. The name Chengziya, literally "city cliff" refers to this location and the wall that encloses the settlement. The Wuyan River flows in the north–south direction to the west of the settlement. The Chengziya settlement had rectangular layout (400 by 500 meters (1,300 by 1,600 ft)) with edges oriented along the north–south and east–west directions. While the western, southern, and eastern walls are straight, the northern wall juts outward following the terrain. The settlement hence covered an area of about 200,000 square meters and was enclosed by a hangtu (rammed earth) wall that stood about 7 metres (23 ft) tall, was 10 metres (33 ft) wide at the base and tapered off to a width 5 metres (16 ft) at the top. The technique for erecting the walls from pounded earth was a new innovation at the time. Successive layers ranging between 12 and 14 centimetres (5.5 in) in thickness were each compacted before the next layer was added. On the outside of the walls was a deep moat that was fed by water from a nearby river. As there are no major walls inside the settlement, the layout conforms to the style of a "platform city" (Chinese: 台城; pinyin: tái chéng).

Chenziya is at the center of a cluster of more than 40 sites belonging to the Longshan Culture. These sites come in three size classes: sites covering from a few thousand up to 10,000 square meters are thought to belong to the ju (Chinese: 居; pinyin: jū; lit. 'settlements') referred to in ancient documents. Larger sites up to 50,000 square meters are believed to be yi (central towns) and finally Chengziya itself has been identified as a du (Chinese: 都; pinyin: dū, capital). Based on thick deposits found at the site (from 3–4 up to 5–6 meters deep), the population of the Chengziya has been estimated to be in the tens of thousands.

== Other settlements ==
After the decline of the Longshan culture, the Chengziya site was occupied by two more walled settlements. One belonging to the Yueshi culture (1900–1500 BC) and the other dated to the time of the Zhou dynasty (1100–256 BC).

== Archaeological study ==
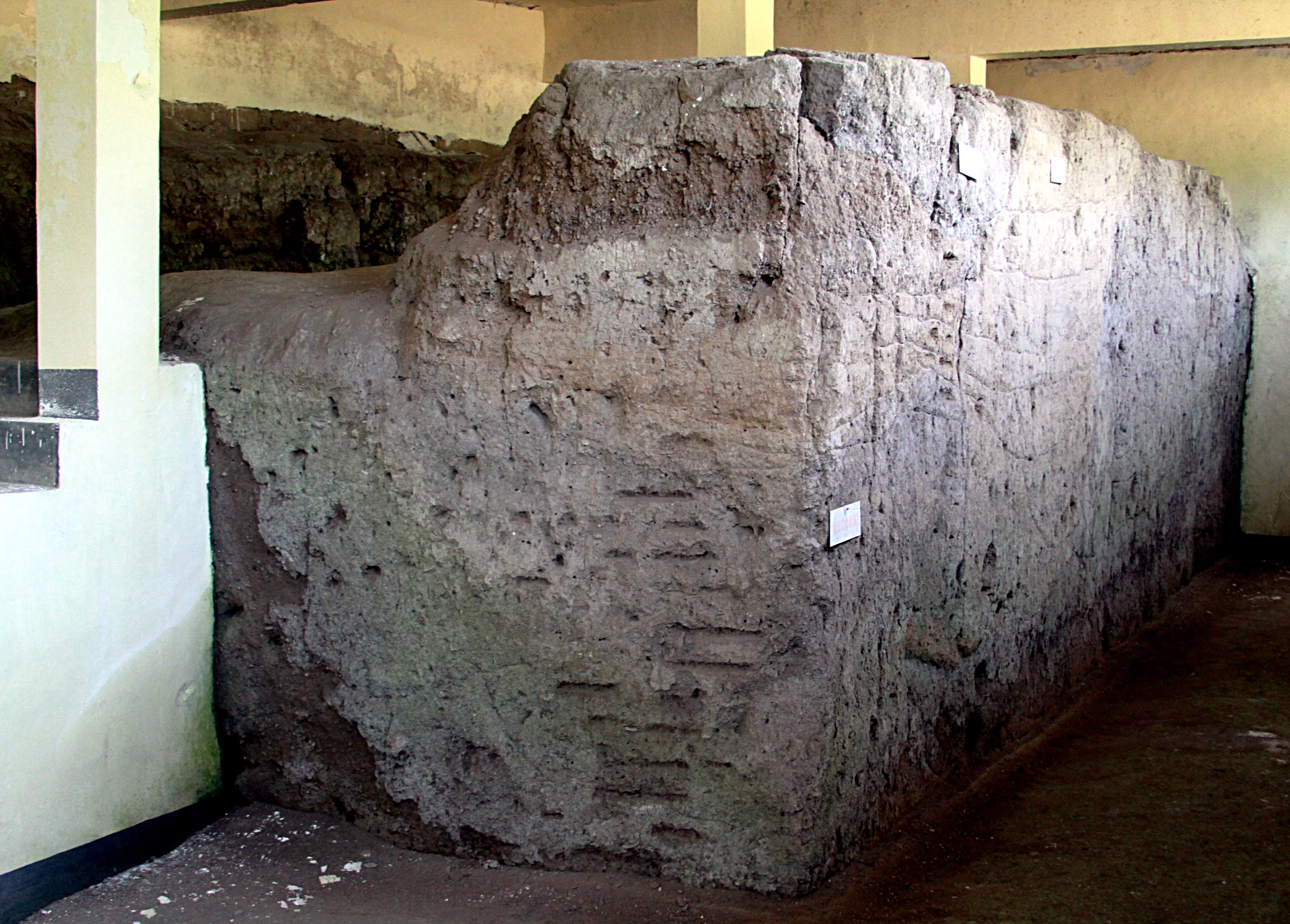
Ancient city wall

The site was discovered in 1928 by the archaeologist Wu Jinding (Chinese: 吴金鼎; pinyin: Wú Jīndǐng, 1901–1948) It was the first discovery of relics from the Longshan Culture which was named for the nearby Longshan (simplified Chinese: 龙山; traditional Chinese: 龍山; pinyin: Lóng Shān, literally "Dragon Hill") and the village of the same name. The first excavations on the site were carried out in the years 1930 and 1931. This was the first time that such field research was carried out exclusively by Chinese archaeologists using modern methods. Additional excavations were carried out in 1990 by the Archaeological Institute of Shandong Province on the southern side of the provincial road.

The cultural layer of the site is divided into upper and lower layers. The cultural accumulation is about 3 meters. The upper layer is the cultural remains of several different periods from the Zhou Dynasty to the Han Dynasty; the lower cultural layer is the first discovery of a Neolithic cultural relic with polished black pottery as the main feature, including part of the Yueshi cultural relic. In fact, it is a site containing three different periods of Longshan culture, Yueshi culture and Zhou Dynasty.

Excavations at the site have unearthed the foundations of houses, pottery kilns and wells as well as pottery items (e.g., tripod cauldrons, cups, jars), stone tools, oracle bones, and weapons.

According to the survey and excavation, most of the city walls were dug with foundation grooves, and some parts were rammed on the ditch and silt, and repaired many times. The rammed earth structure of the city wall is divided into two types, one is rammed with stones, and the other is rammed with single sticks. It shows that the city wall is divided into morning and evening, reflecting the development process of ramming technology during the Longshan culture period.

Several wells were found in the excavation area of more than 1,000 square meters, with high repairing and chiseling techniques and extremely regular shapes. One of the wells is oval in shape, with a diameter of about 1.5 meters long, a width of about 1.1 meters, and a depth of more than 7 meters. Such wells have also been found in Longshan cultural sites such as Xiwu Temple in Yanzhou and Fenghuangtai in Qingzhou, indicating that wells were widely used during the Longshan culture period in Shandong.

Characteristic items found at the site include fine black polished pottery, in particular wheel-turned vessels with an angular outline, abundant gray pottery, as well as rectangular polished stone axes. Some of the pottery found features inscriptions.

The objects found inside the Chengziya settlement were in general of higher quality than those of the surrounding areas, which is taken as an indication that Chengziya as a regional capital received tribute from the surrounding smaller settlements.

Chengziya is one of the few neolithic sites at which horse bones have been found. However, the recovered material does not allow it to be determined whether horses had already been domesticated at the time.

== Museum ==
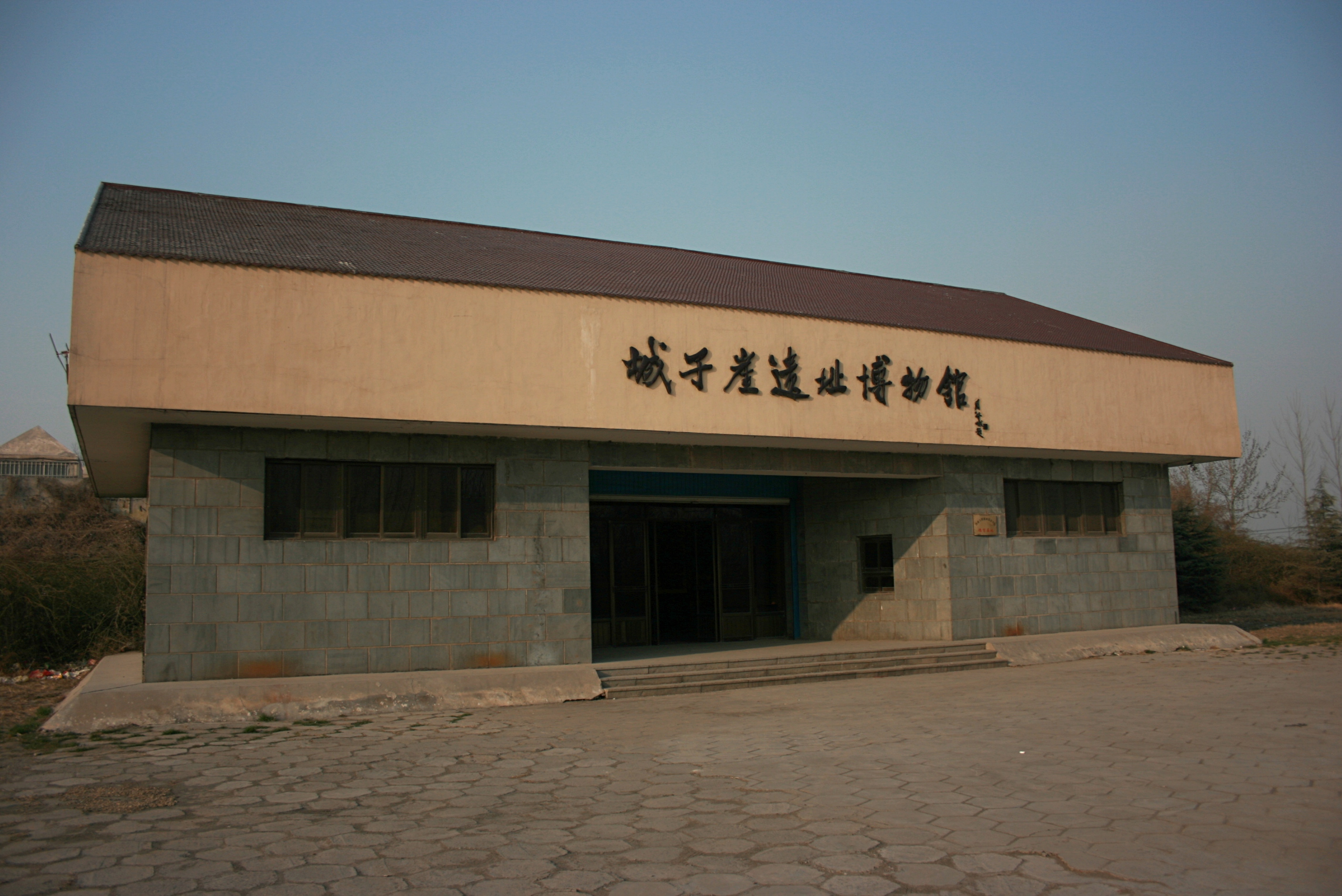
Entrance building to the museum

The Chengziya Ruins Museum is located 100 m to the east of the neolithic settlement. It covers an area of 20,000 square meters of which 4,000 square meters are occupied by the main building. The museum building was designed by Yang Hongxun, an expert on historical buildings. The building is shaped like a mythical bird with the wings containing the exhibition halls and the body conference facilities. The museum was opened in September 1994, the total construction cost was 6 million Chinese Yuan. The museum complex also houses the Jinan Longshan Culture Research Institute. Since its opening, the museum has received more than 500,000 visitors.

== Archaeological significance ==
The excavation of the Chengziya site revealed a black pottery culture that is different from the red pottery culture, indicating that the black pottery culture represents a cultural system. It ushered in a new era of field archaeology in China, effectively overturned the fallacy of "Western Origin", and brought a major turning point in the discussion of the "Native Origin" of Chinese culture.

The appearance of Longshan culture can be different from the known Yangshao culture, but there is a profound connection between it and the Shang culture represented by Yin Ruins, such as oracle bone inscriptions, so it is a key to exploring the origin of Chinese civilization.

Beginning in the 1990s, the Shandong Provincial Institute of Cultural Relics and Archaeology once again excavated the Chengziya site. It is preliminarily determined that the Chengziya settlement is the central settlement of the Zhangqiu settlement group with the Longshan culture and Yueshi culture for more than 1,000 years. This discovery is of great significance for studying the development of ancient Chinese cities and the origin of Chinese civilization.

== Political significance ==
The remains of the Longshan Culture at Chengziya are cultivated by the government as a source of national pride in the long history of Chinese civilization. The Chengziya site was among the first historical and cultural sites to be placed under government protection in 1961 (State Council resolution number 1-140). Furthermore, it has since been declared a first-tier "patriotism education" site by the municipal and provincial government. Its political importance has been stressed by visits of political leaders.

== See also ==
- List of Neolithic cultures of China
- List of sites in Jinan
