= Drama (MENA TV channel) =

Emirati television channel

Coordinates: 24°28′N 54°22′E

Drama TV
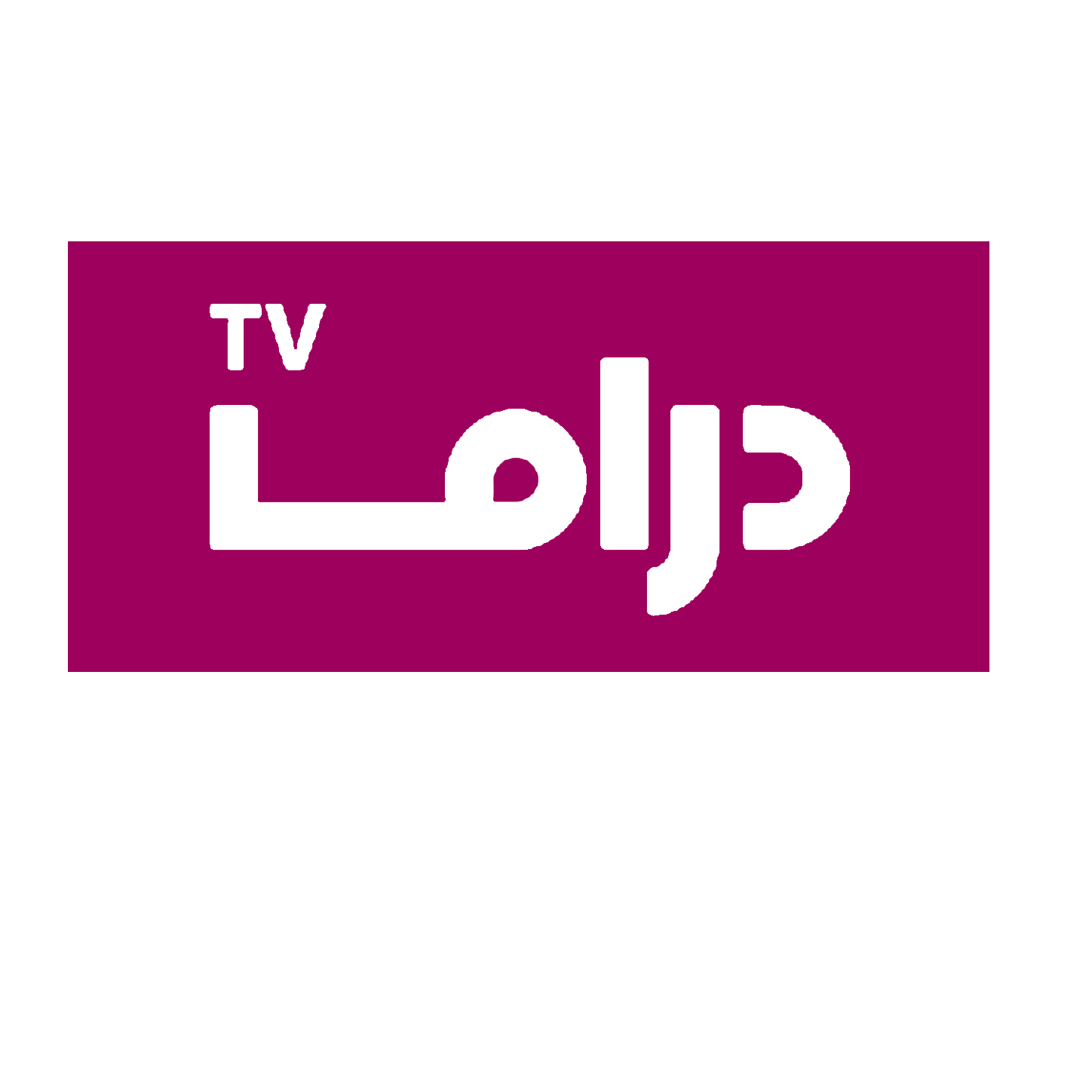
- Country: United Arab Emirates and Egypt
- Broadcast area: Middle East; North Africa
- Headquarters: Abu Dhabi, UAE

Programming
- Language: English
- Picture format: 1080i HDTV; 576i SDTV

Ownership
- Owner: Abu Dhabi Media
- Sister channels: Abu Dhabi TV; Emarat TV; AD Sports; Yas Sports; Edge Sport; Majid TV; National Geographic Abu Dhabi

History
- Launched: 5 April 2010; 16 years ago
- Closed: 1 January 2022; 4 years ago
- Former names: Abu Dhabi Drama (2010–2016)

Links
- Website: www.addrama.ae

Drama TV (Arabic: قناة دراما, Qanāt Drāmā), formerly known as Abu Dhabi Drama (Arabic: أبوظبي دراما, Abū Ẓabī Drāmā) and sometimes referred to as AD Drama, was a Pan Arab television channel owned by Abu Dhabi Media. It programmed movies and television series. Programs were subtitled in Arabic. The channel aired 24-hour without commercials, in addition to crime-related North American serials, broadcast every day under the programming block Fox Crime. Hollywood films were also aired Fridays at 7 p.m. (UTC), under the block Telecine Night. It was launched on 5 April 2010.

On 19 February 2020, the channel got a new logo after 9 years, and on 1 January 2022, the channel was closed.

== Programming ==
Programming included American television series and films. For current programming, the key symbol denoted by bold, and for programming block distributed by Fox Crime Disney ABC Studios, it was denoted by a cross (†).

=== Canada ===
- Cracked
- King^{†}
- Ties That Bind

=== United States ===
- Boston Legal
- Low Winter Sun^{†}
- Prison Break
- Black-ish
- Black-ish (season 1)
- Black-ish (season 3)
- Black-ish (season 4)
- Black-ish (season 5)
- Station 19
- Code Black
- The Crossing
- Dead of Summer
- Once Upon a Time
- Luke Cage
- Resurrection
- Kevin (Probably) Saves the World
- For the People
- Scandal
- Take Two
- Beyond
- CSI (franchise)
- CSI: Cyber
- Blue Bloods

=== Films ===
- Beauty and the Beast
- Captain America: Civil War
- Guardians of the Galaxy Vol. 2
- Doctor Strange
- Thor: Ragnarok
- Avengers: Endgame
- Mulan

== Other services ==
- Drama TV + was a paid version of Drama TV available on OSN till September 10, 2019.
- Drama HD was a simulcast of Drama TV in high-definition (HD) launched in June 6, 2016 via Nilesat.
- ADTV Catch-Up was Drama TV's video on demand service that allows users to view past and present episodes of its shows.

== See also ==
- Arab television drama
- Abu Dhabi Media
- Television in the United Arab Emirates
