= 17th of Ramadan Mosque =

Mosque in Baghdad, Iraq

- جامع ١٧ من رمضان
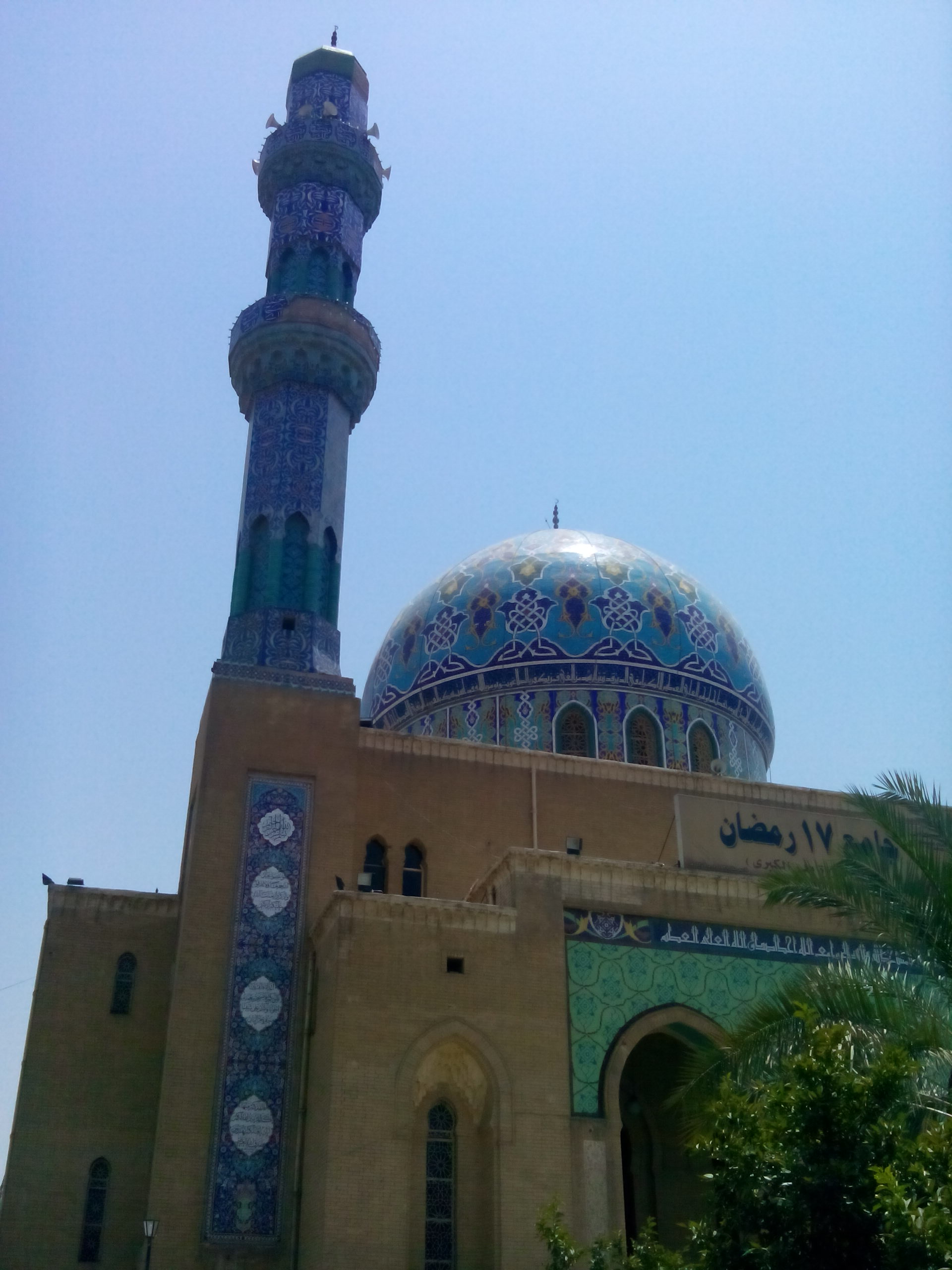
- The mosque dome and minaret in 2017

- Location of the mosque in Baghdad

Religion
- Affiliation: Islam
- Ecclesiastical or organizational status: Mosque
- Status: Active

Location
- Location: al-Rusafa Baghdad, Baghdad Governorate
- Country: Iraq
- Interactive map of 17th of Ramadan Mosque
- Coordinates: 33.3147°N 44.4220°E

Architecture
- Type: Mosque architecture
- Completed: 1959

Specifications
- Dome: One
- Minaret: One
- Site area: 5,000 m^{2} (54,000 sq ft)

The 17th of Ramadan Mosque (Arabic: جامع ١٧ من رمضان, romanized: Jami' Sabata'sh Ramaḍān) is a mosque in al-Rusafa, Baghdad, in the Baghdad Governorate of Iraq. The mosque is situated in the eastern Karrada district, opposite al-Firdos Square, in front of the Ishtar Hotel. The mosque dates from the royal era of Iraq and is considered an important historical landmark since it is located in a significant square in the city.

== History ==
=== Background ===
The foundation stone was laid during the reign of King Ghazi of Iraq. Work was completed on the 14 July Revolution on July 14, 1959, by Abd al-Karim Qasim. The original name of the mosque was the "Mosque of the Martyr". Despite the official opening in July 1959, prayers did not take place in the mosque until December 6, 1963, during the era of Abd al-Salam Arif. At that time, the mosque was renamed to the "14th of Ramadan Mosque" in honor of the 1963 Ramadan Ba'ath Revolution.

The mosque also has a history of bearing many names, the mosque was originally going to be named "al-Alawiyyah Mosque" but after the 14 July Revolution, it was called the "Republic Mosque." But Qasim wanted to rename it "Mosque of the Martyr" after its opening.

=== Later events ===
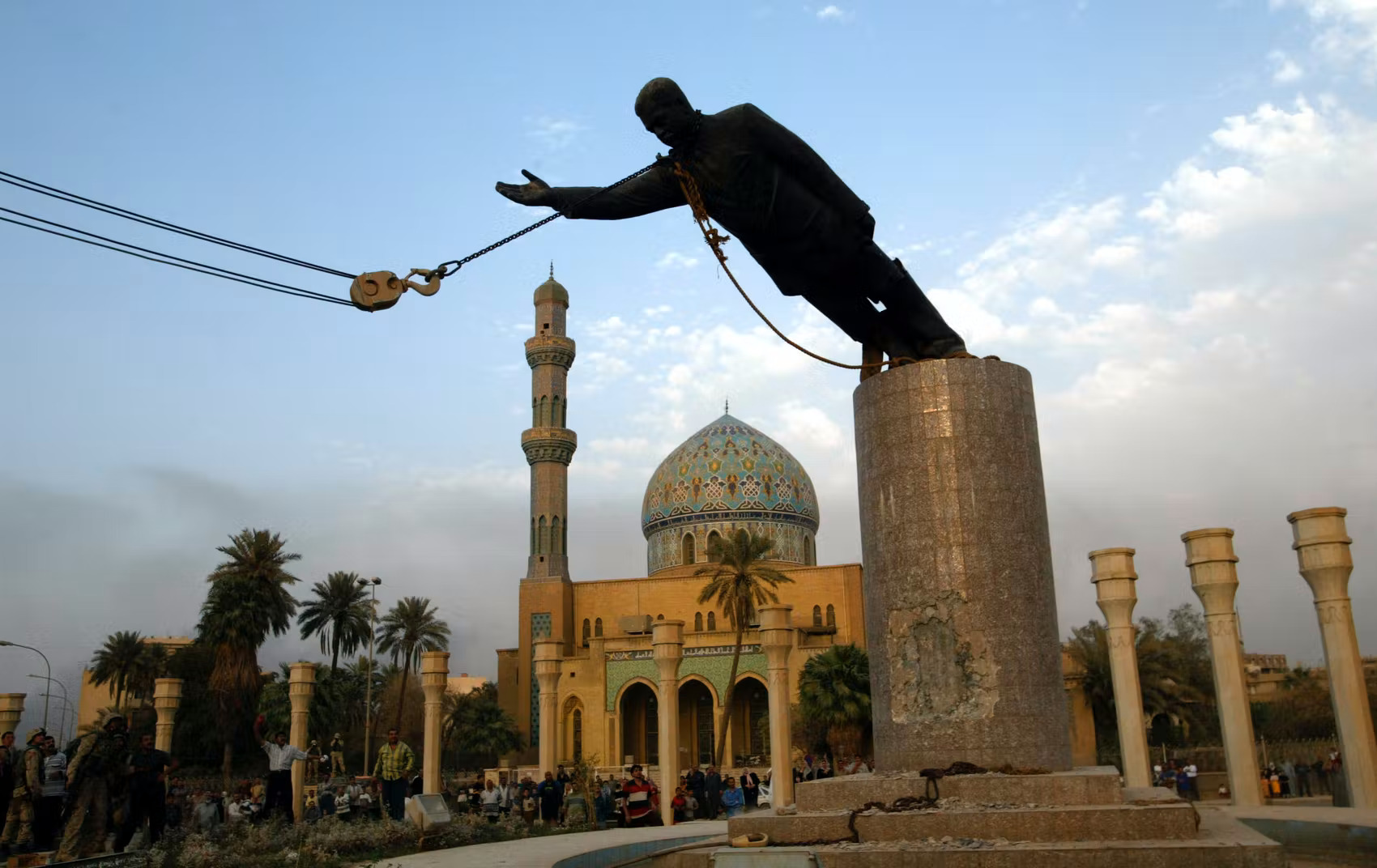
The mosque in the background of the infamous toppling of Saddam Hussein's statue

In 1959, Abd al-Karim Qasim inaugurated the first Monument of the Unknown Soldier in front of the mosque in al-Firdos Square, and to be a shrine for senior political figures who would visit Iraq and lay wreaths there, and with the fluctuations that affected the mosque with its various names, the square remained bearing the name of al-Firdos, then the monument was demolished in 1959. 1981 and it was re-erected in another place and a statue of former President Saddam Hussein was placed in its stead. During the US invasion of Iraq the statue was taken down and the mosque was renamed to its current name to commemorate the Battle of Badr. The square, along with the mosque, became a symbol of the end of an era and the beginning of a new Iraq, however, it also symbolized the chaos that would come after the invasion. The mosque remains active with Friday prayers held for both Sunni and Shi'a Muslims.

== Description ==
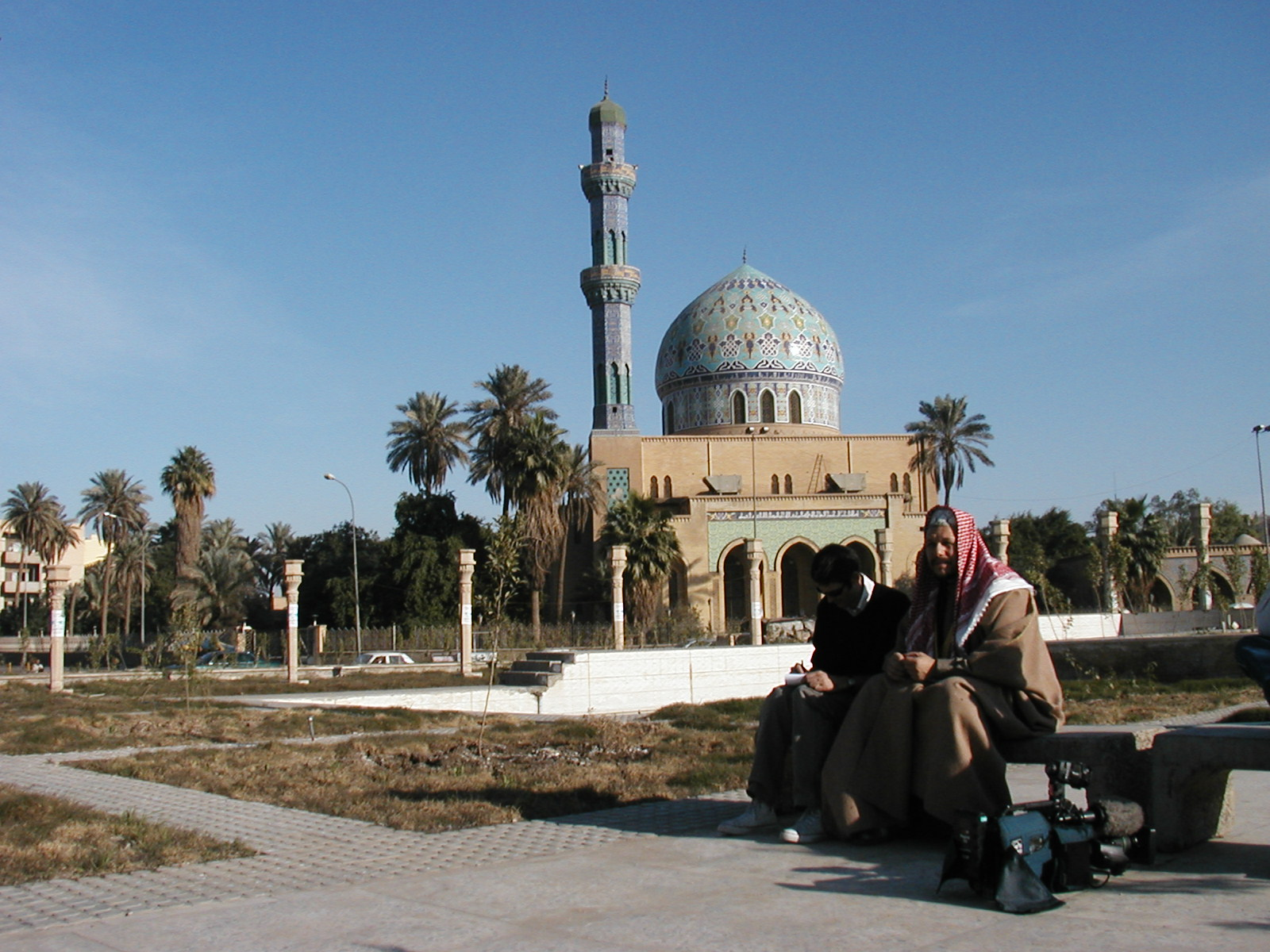
A view of the mosque in al-Firdos Square in 2003.

The mosque is considered important and is distinguished by its beautiful Islamic construction and style, and it is considered one of the ancient urban landmarks of Baghdad. The total area of the mosque is 5,000 square metres (54,000 sq ft), and the mosque contains a large chapel that can accommodate more than 2,500 worshippers. Including a chapel for women, a room for administration and workers, and a garden around the sanctuary. It also contains a house dedicated to the imam and the preacher and a hall for holding religious events and mourning councils. It also holds a center that studies and helps memorize the Qur'an that goes by the name of "Ahl al-Qur’an Center".

The mosque also features calligraphy and painting by Hashem Muhammad al-Baghdadi, an Iraqi master calligrapher. The inscriptions are made in the direction of the qibla and overlooks the gardens of the mosque. Al-Baghdadi's contribution to the mosque is frequently considered one of his greatest works.

== Gallery ==
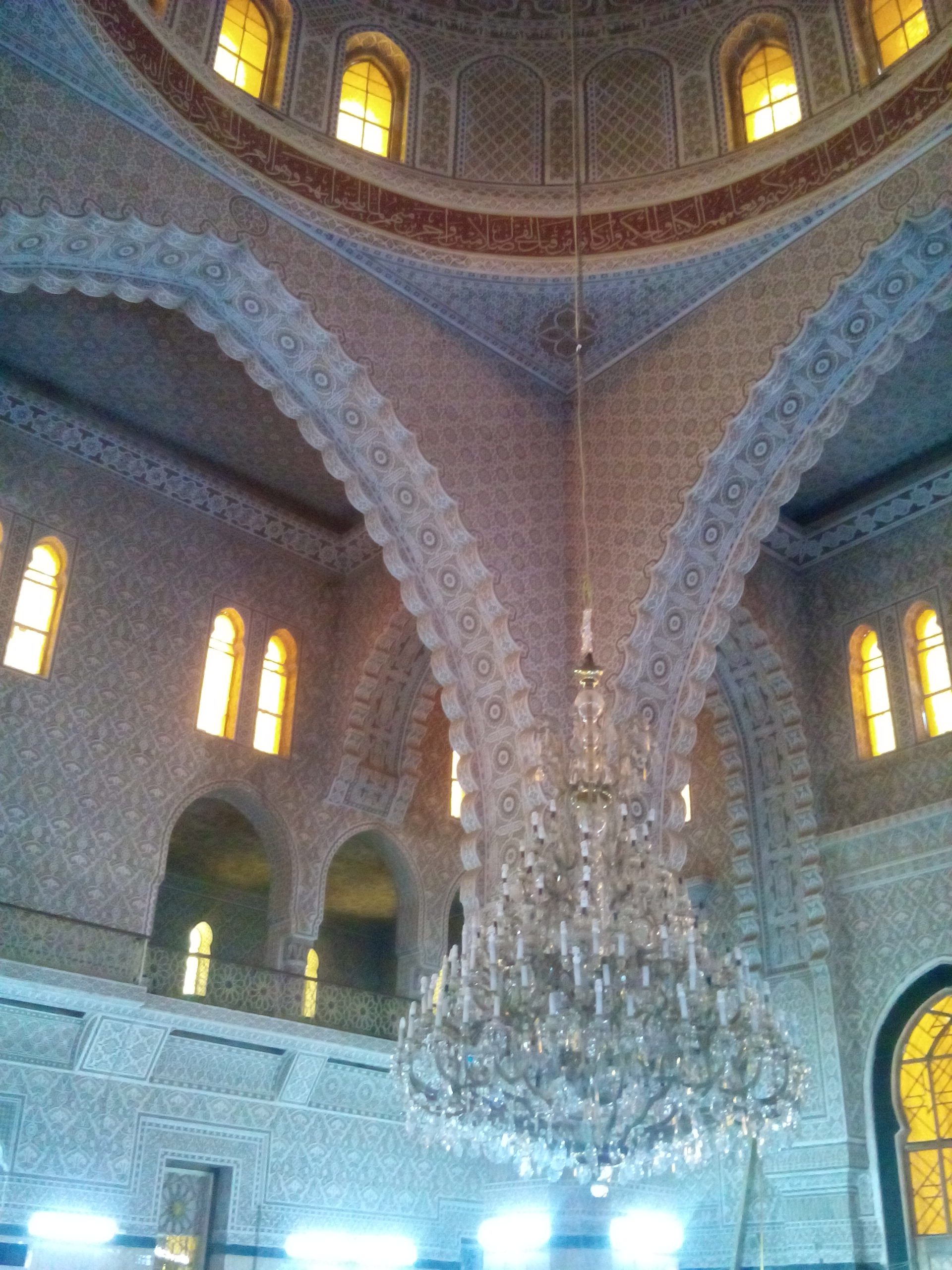
Wall and ceiling decorations in the chapel

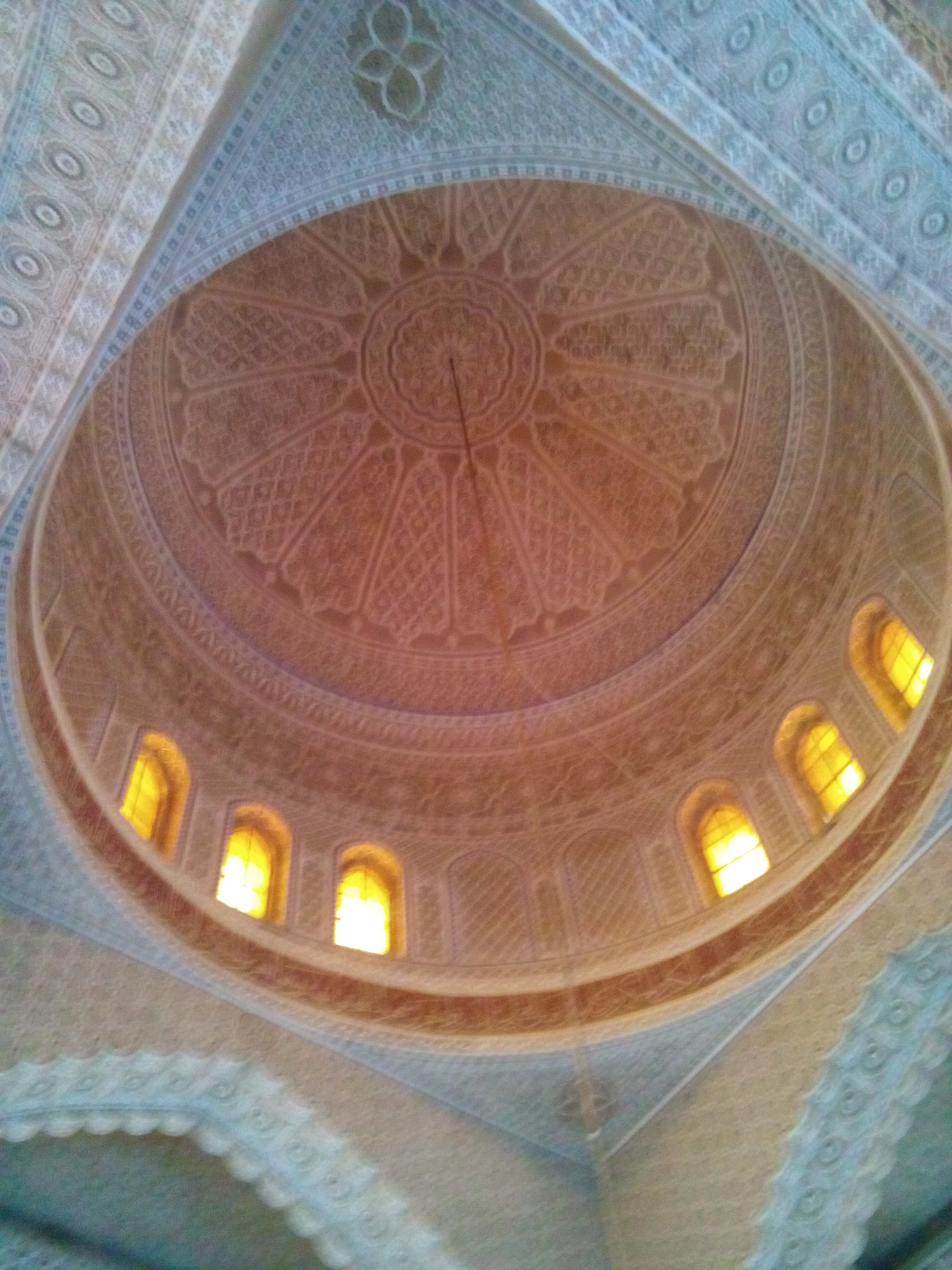
The inside of the dome

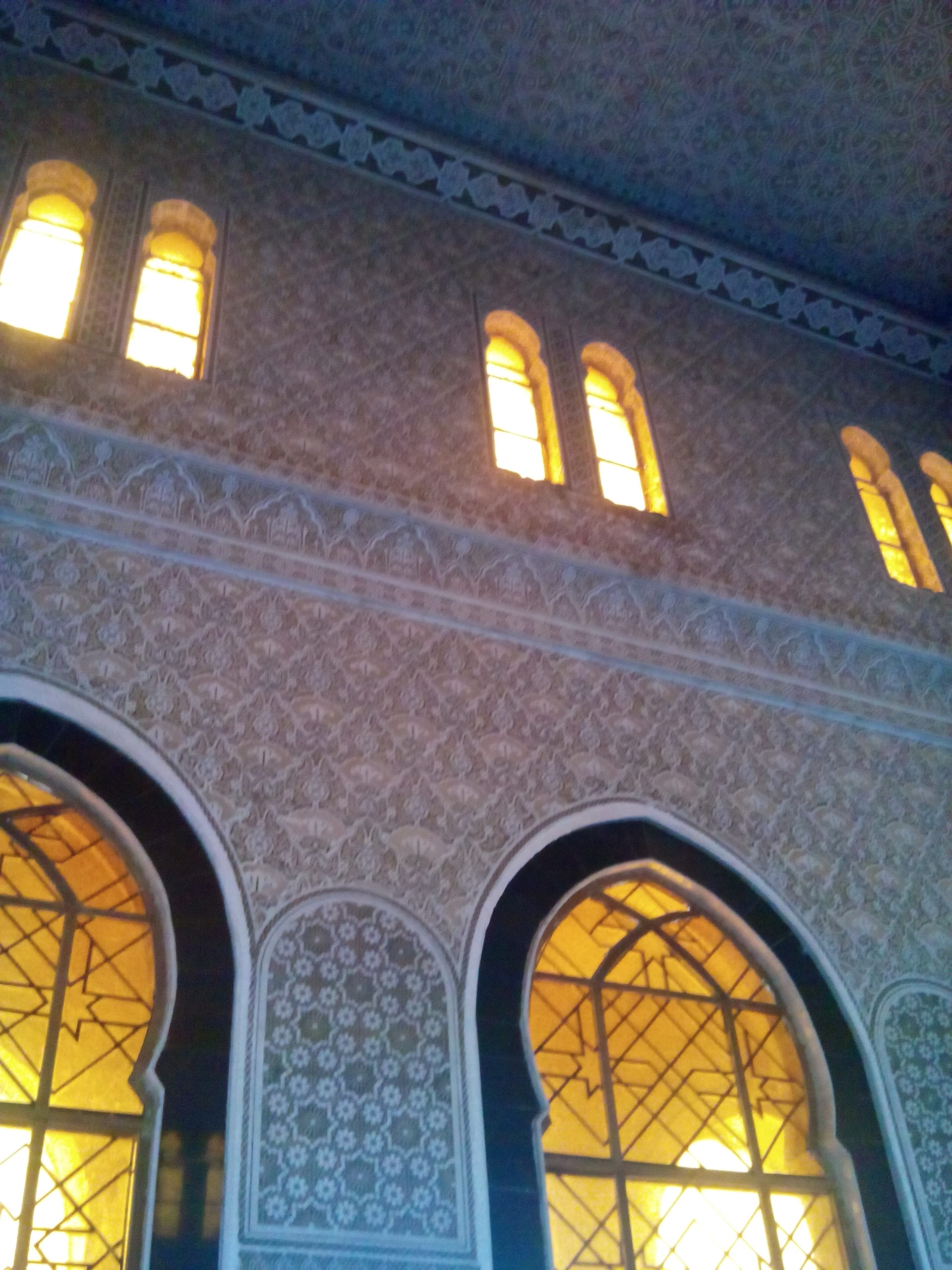
The inside walls

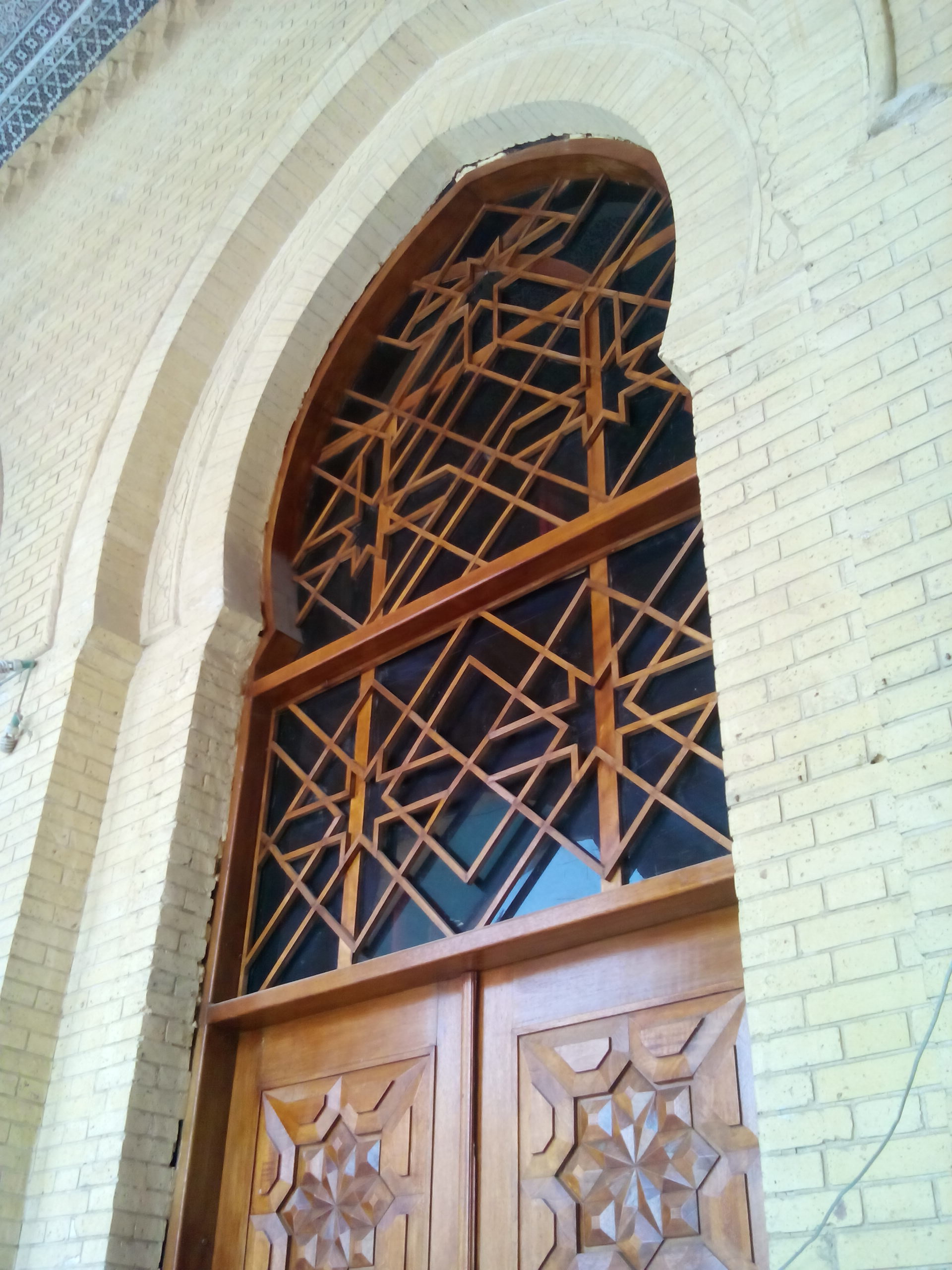
Ornate wooden door

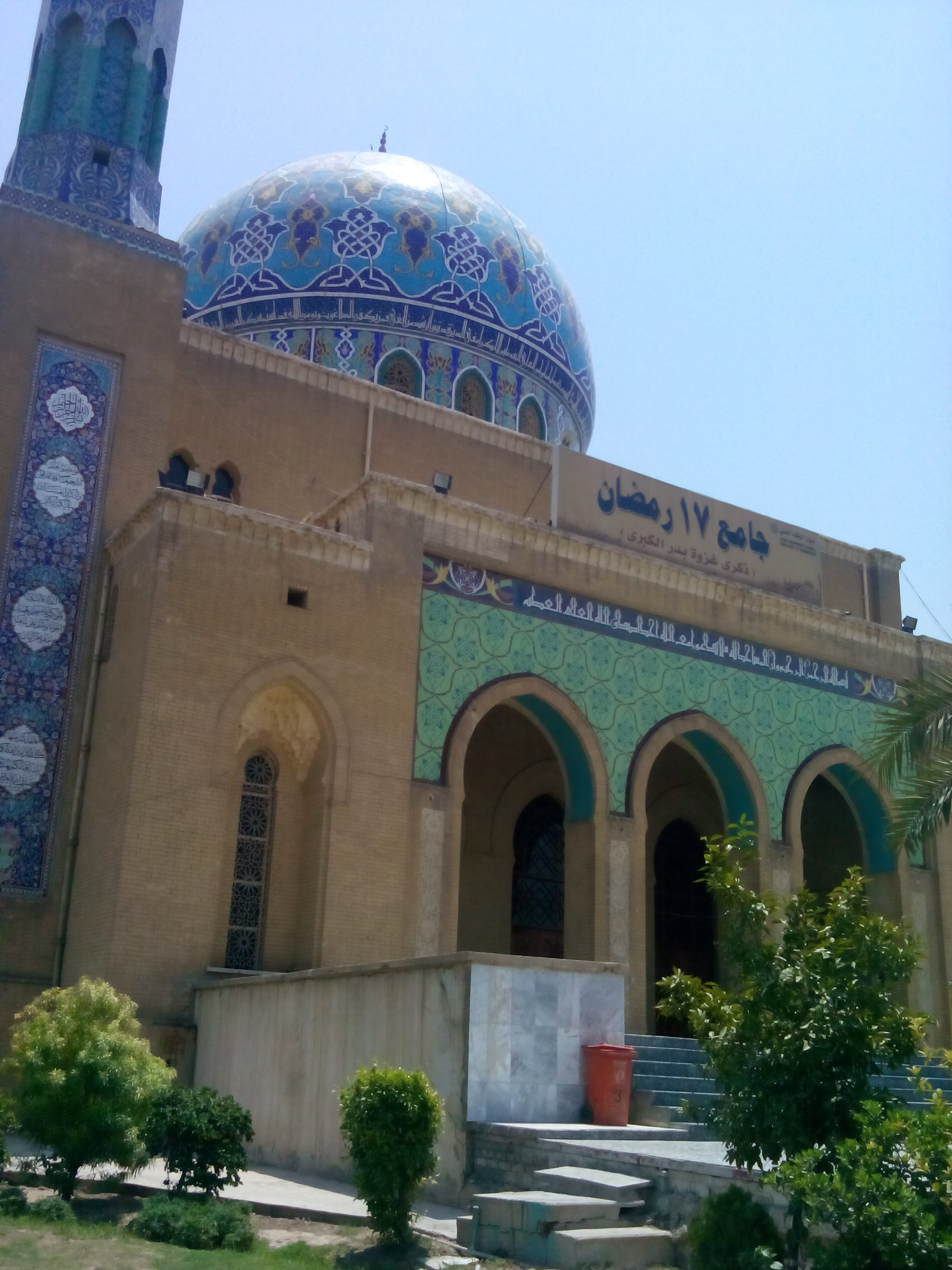
Façade of the mosque

== See also ==
- Islam in Iraq
- List of mosques in Baghdad
- Al-Sa'doun Street
