= Al-Sa'doun Street =

Historic street in Baghdad, Iraq

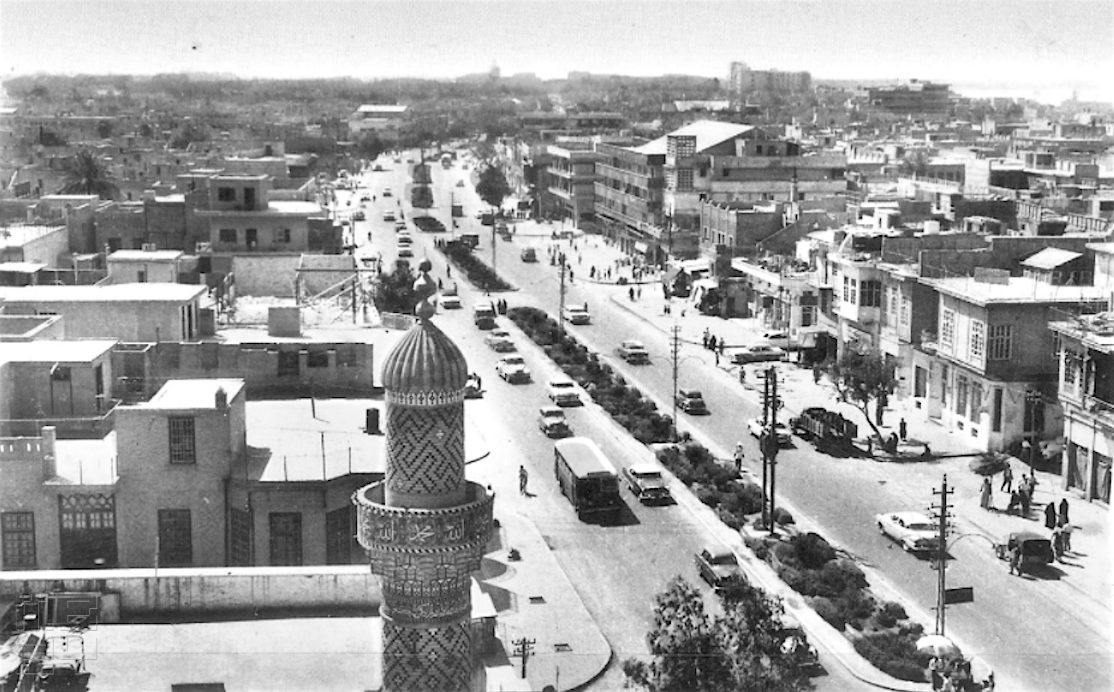
- The street in the 1950s.
- Interactive map of Al-Sa'doun Street
- Native name: Arabic: شارع السعدون
- Location: Baghdad, Iraq
- Coordinates: 33°19′23″N 44°24′48″E

Other
- Status: Active

Al-Sa'doun Street or al-Sa'adoun Street (Arabic: شارع السعدون, romanized: Shari' al-Sa'doun) is one of the main streets of Baghdad, Iraq, which connects the districts of al-Rusafa and eastern Karrada and located in al-Sa'doun neighborhood. The street runs from al-Tahrir Square to the Kahramana Square where the Kahramana monument is located with al-Firdos Square located in the middle of it which contains the 17th of Ramadan Mosque, the Palestine Hotel and the Ishtar Hotel. The street was also notable for including many cinemas, cafés, libraries, and shops.

The Ba'ath party under Saddam Hussein also opened the first public internet center on this street.

== History ==
Development of the street began in the 1930s and most of the houses and buildings on the street date back to the 1940s and 1950s. During this period, workers of limited income and families with high incomes started to move into the street. The street was named in honor of former-Iraqi Prime Minister Abd al-Muhsin al-Sa'doun who was found dead in 1929 in one of the squares of the street. As such, a bronze statue dedicated to him was built in the street.

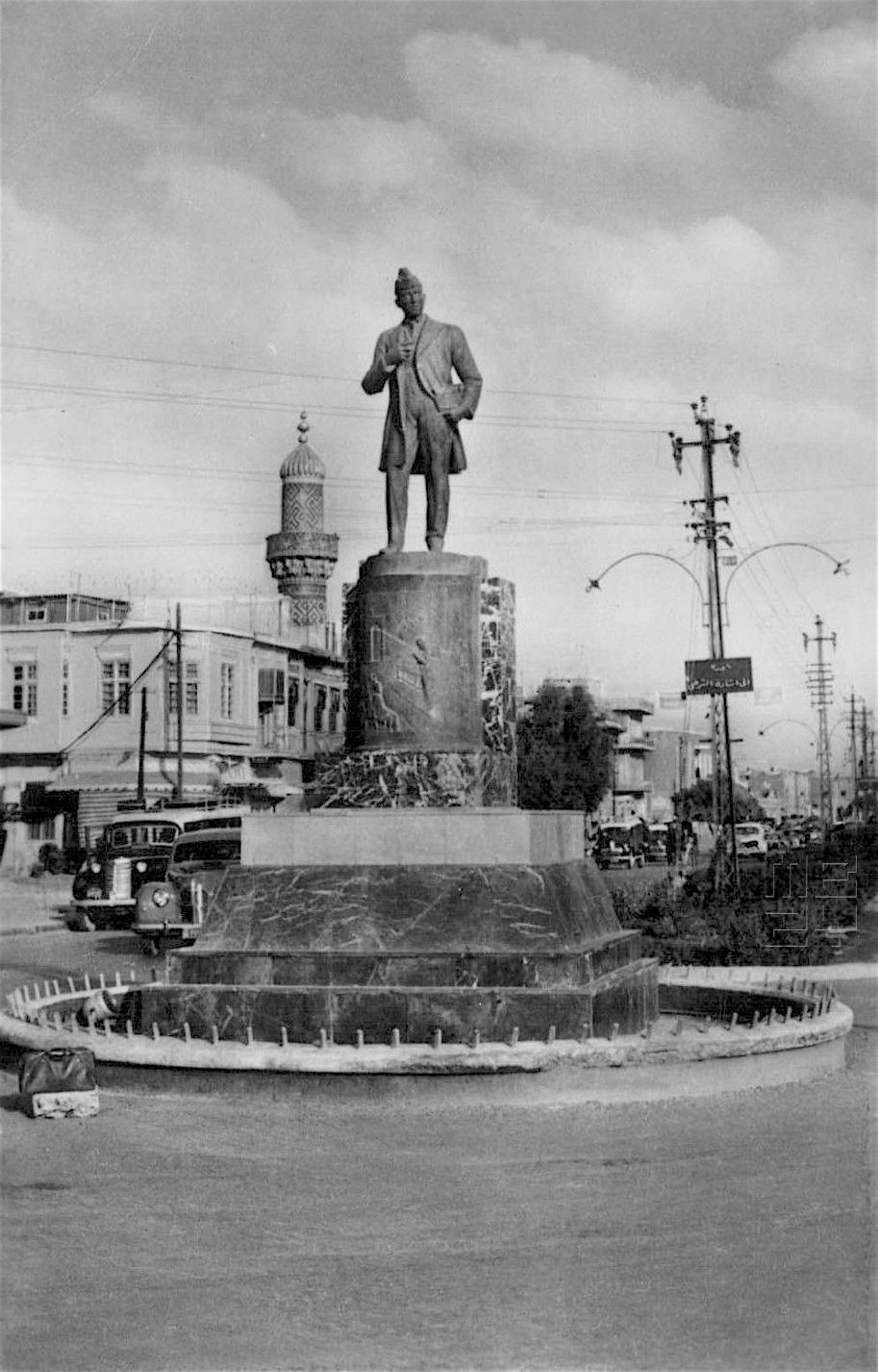
Statue of al-Sa'doun wearing the Baghdadi Sidara in the 1950s in front of the Orfali Mosque.

The street was home to various cafés. One of these is the Orfali Café which was replaced in the 1930s with the Orfali Cinema which was later renamed "Sindibad Cinema" after the One Thousand and One Nights character of the same name. In the late 1960s, the beginning of the street saw the establishment of al-Moqaddin Café, a café that notably hosted a group of writers who were famous for their rebellious nature against the prevailing cultural scene at the time, and looked at more Western and modern literature trends. These include the polish poor theater and westernization. The discussion writers had included artist topics about absurdity, existence, non-existence, textual production, and commitment. Baghdadi Poet Sharif al-Ruba'ie used to visit this café with other writers. Another café, the Kit-Kat Café, was established in front of al-Tahrir Square next to various libraries situated on the street. The café was designed in European architecture.

The street also saw the establishment of the 17th of Ramadan Mosque in al-Firdos Square as well as the first Monument to t'he Unknown Soldier which was established by Abd al-Karim Qasim. However, the monument was later demolished and was moved to the Green Zone in al-Karkh. Instead, a statue dedicated to former-Iraqi President Saddam Hussein was erected with 37 columns, symbolizing Saddam's birth in 1937. The street was also filled with libraries. Among these were al-Nahda Library, al-Shorouk Library, al-Muthana Library and, al-Mada Library.

The activities on the street started to decline in the 1990s and after the events of the US-led invasion of Iraq, many parts of the street became neglected, its buildings started to crumble, and experienced many explosions as well as many electricity generators being placed. The street became full of filth and the tunnel of the street was at one point closed due to the garbage in it. The statue of al-Sa'doun has also been robbed but was later replaced with a replica. The street also saw the toppling of Saddam Hussein's statue at al-Firdos Square.

In 2017, al-Sa'doun Street was among the many areas in Baghdad that were closed due to protests in the area. Security forces have also closed the street in order to protect people visiting al-Kadhimiya. In 2020, after a long process which spanned a decade, al-Firdos Square was restored in hopes of leaving its dark past behind and becoming a cultural hub.

== Places of worship ==
- 17th of Ramadan Mosque is a historic mosque located in al-Firdos Square which is in the middle of the street. The mosque's construction first began in 1938 but its construction was complete on July 14, 1959. The mosque is 5,000 square meters and can contain 2,500 worshippers. It is also home to the “Ahl al-Qur’an Center" which for teaching and memorizing the Qur’an.
- Orfali Mosque (Arabic: جامع الاورفلي), a mosque built by Hajja Najia al-Orfali, the wife of the well-known Baghdadi politician Ahmed Izzat al-Adhami, in 1952. The mosque is built of original Baghdadi bricks called "al-Jaghfin". The mosque used to contain an artistic door before an explosion in 2006 damaged it and replaced it with an iron door. The mosque currently suffers from neglect and underdevelopment.

== See also ==
- Al-Rasheed Street
- Abu Nuwas Street
- Café culture of Baghdad
