= Abu Dhabi Media Network =

Emirati media company

Abu Dhabi Media Network شبكة أبو ظبي للإعلام
- Logo used since 2023
- Formerly: Emirates Media (1999-2007); Abu Dhabi Media Company (2007-2011)
- Type: state-owned enterprise
- Industry: Publishing, Broadcasting, Digital media
- Founded: June 7, 1999; 27 years ago
- Headquarters: Abu Dhabi, United Arab Emirates
- Key people: Dr. Sultan bin Ahmad Sultan Al Jaber
- Products: TV Series, TV Programs, Movies, Magazines, Newspapers, Software application, Websites
- Owner: Government of Abu Dhabi
- Number of employees: 1,800 (approx.)
- Subsidiaries: LIVE
- Website: www.admn.ae

Abu Dhabi Media Network (ADMN; Arabic: شبكة أبو ظبي للإعلام, romanized: Shabakah Abū Ẓaby lil-Iʻlām) is the official media organization of the Government of Abu Dhabi. The organization was established in 1999.

The company manages over 20 brands in two categories. ADM brands include Abu Dhabi TV, Al Emarat TV, Abu Dhabi Sports Channel, Radio 1, Radio 2, National Geographic Abu Dhabi, Yas TV, The Holy Quran Radio, Emarat FM, Abu Dhabi Radio AM And FM, Star FM, Abu Dhabi Classic FM, and Kadak FM. It also includes Al-Ittihad, Zahrat Al Khaleej, Majid TV, and National Geographic Al Arabiya across the publishing platform. ADM operates websites as well as applications for Zahrat Al Khaleej, Majid, Zayed Digital TV, and Mohtawa.

== Incorporation ==
The company was founded in 1999 as Emirates Media.

The company was created in June 2007 by Law No 13 of 2007 as a joint stock company (wholly owned by the government of Abu Dhabi) from the assets of Emirates Media Incorporated. Crown Prince of Abu Dhabi Mohammad Bin Zayed Al Nahyan, formed the five-member board of directors, which included Sheikh Al Nahyan, Mohammad Khalaf Al Mazroui (chair of the board), Ahmad Ali Al Sayegh (deputy chairman), Mohammad Omar Abdullah, Mubarak Hamad Al Muhairi, and Abdullah Musleh Al Ahbabi. The company's initial capitalization was Dh100 million (about $27.3 million in inflation-adjusted 2009 U.S. dollars). Riyad al-Mubarak was named the company's chief executive officer.

== Activities ==
One of the first acts the new company took was to launch Abu Dhabi's first English newspaper, The National, in August 2007 (although the paper did not debut until April 2008). Martin Newland, former editor of The Daily Telegraph, was named the newspaper's first editor. The newspaper was given five years before it had to produce a balanced budget. A year later, in October 2008, the company appointed Gavin Dickinson its executive director of publishing, with authority over the media firm's newspapers, its United Printing and Publishing printing company, and its publication distribution business.

In early 2008, the company launched Abu Dhabi TV. Karim Sarkis (formerly of the Lebanese Broadcasting Corporation), was named its executive director, and Ricky Ghai (previously executive vice president of programming at Orbit, was named the executive director of digital media. When it debuted, Abu Dhabi TV was the 20th most-watched Arab satellite channel, but soon reached 7th or 8th within a few months (in particular, based on the strength of its Million's Poet show). October 2008 saw the company announce the creation of the Abu Dhabi Media Zone—a 200,000 square meter campus for foreign media companies. CNN, HarperCollins, Random House, the BBC, The Financial Times and the Thomson Reuters Foundation agreed to establish operations on the site, with several of the companies offering training in journalism and filmmaking for Arab students.

The company expanded heavily in motion pictures soon thereafter. It hosted the first 10-day Middle East International Film Festival in October 2007. The festival is led by Peter Scarlet, formerly the creative director at the Tribeca Film Festival. In May 2008 the company signed an agreement with Toonz Academy, a traditional and computer animation company based in Thiruvananthapuram, Kerala, India, to establish an animators' training center in Abu Dhabi.

In September 2008, the company established a subsidiary, Imagenation, with access to more than $1 billion with which to finance film production. The company named former Walt Disney Pictures executive Edward Borgerding as its chief executive officer, and veteran motion picture production executive Stefan Brunner as its chief financial officer. Later in September, Imagenation signed a multibillion-dollar agreement to produce films, television shows, documentaries, and other media with Warner Bros. The deal set aside $500 million for film production and $500 million for video game production, and included agreements for both companies to develop real estate, theme parks, and new media projects as well. A side agreement created a separate investment fund for Arab-language films. Later the same month, the company announced a $250 million production pact with U.S.-based Participant Media, which produces socially relevant films and television specials. Imagenation announced a $100 million joint production agreement in October 2008 with the National Geographic Films to finance 10-15 feature films over five years, and followed up a month later with a $250 million deal with Ashok Amritraj's Hyde Park Entertainment to develop 20 feature films over seven years. But the billion-dollar Warner Bros. deal produced only one film (Robert Rodriguez's Shorts) and a number of video game titles in its first 18 months. Problems with the deal included its lack of details and the 2008-2009 credit crunch, and the possibility that Warner Bros. was not offering Abu Dhabi Media Company first look at its prime motion picture vehicles. The National Geographic deal, however, proved less problematic. In January 2009, Imagenation announced that director Peter Weir would direct The Way Back, a drama starring Colin Farrell and Ed Harris based on the true story of a group of soldiers in World War II who escape from a Siberian gulag in 1942.

Beginning in 2007, the company began hosting "Circle", an annual conference dedicated to the financing and production of motion pictures, and to the training of producers, directors, editors, and other film technical personnel and acting talent.

In October 2011, the company announced that its Imagenation Abu Dhabi was changing its name to "Image Nation," and would create two subsidiaries: Image Nation Abu Dhabi and Image Nation International.

On 3 April 2017, Abu Dhabi Media announced the relaunch of Radio 1 and Radio 2 from Gulf News Broadcasting, who lost the license to operate the stations the previous year, prompting them to suspend operations. ADM relaunched the stations on the same day.

On 11 April 2019, Abu Dhabi Media and UFC today announced a multi-year broadcast partnership to provide access to all UFC events with the first event broadcast on April 11, 2019, with UFC 236.

In July 2019 the board of directors of Abu Dhabi Developmental Holding Company, ADDHC, issued a resolution to restructure the board of Abu Dhabi Media Company. The new board is chaired by Dr. Sultan Ahmed Al Jaber and includes the following members: Noura bint Mohammed Al Kaabi – deputy chair; Mohamad Abdulla Al Junaibi – Member; Dr. Ali Rashid Al Nuaimi – Member, and Mr. Nart Bouran - Member.

On 19 September 2023, Abu Dhabi Media was rebranded to Abu Dhabi Media Network.

== Assets ==
=== Television ===
- Abu Dhabi TV
- Al Emarat TV
- Abu Dhabi Sports (1, 2)
- Yas TV
- Majid Kids TV
- National Geographic Abu Dhabi
- National Geographic Channel
- Nat Geo Wild
- Baynounah TV

=== Radio ===
- The Holy Quran Radio (religion)
- Emarat FM (entertainment with commercial)
- Abu Dhabi Radio (A non-commercial general radio)
- Star FM (entertainment with commercial)
- Abu Dhabi Classic FM (A non-commercial classical music radio)
- Kadak FM (A Hindi, Punjabi, Malayalam, Marathi, Telugu, Tamil, Kannada and Urdu entertainment with commercial)
- Radio 1 (commercial CHR station)
- Radio 2 (commercial classic songs station)

=== Publishing ===
- Al-Ittihad
- Zahrat Al Khaleej
- Majid
- National Geographic (Arabic-language version)
- National Geographic (English-language version)

=== Digital media ===
- Zayed Digital TV
- Mohtawa

=== Others ===
- Tawzea
- United Printing and Publishing

== See also ==
- Abu Dhabi Developmental Holding Company
