= Kadhem Sharif =

Iraqi wrestler and weightlifter (born 1952)

Personal information
- Nickname: al-Yabani ("the Japanese" in Arabic)
- Born: 1952 (age 73–74) Kingdom of Iraq

Sport
- Country: Iraq
- Club: Iraqi national wrestling team
- Now coaching: Deputy coach of the Iraqi national wrestling team
- Updated on 2007-07-25

Kadhem Sharif al-Jabouri is an Iraqi wrestler and weightlifter. He attempted to use a sledgehammer to bring down the statue of Saddam Hussein at the Firdos Square in Baghdad.

== Biography ==
Kadhem Sharif was born in 1952 and like his father became obsessed with motorcycles. "I was 12 when I sneaked out on my father's Harley for the first time. I bought my first one eight years later, a 1966 Fatboy," Sharif recalls.

As he grew up he also developed a passion for wrestling and weightlifting, becoming a world-class athlete. Many of his sporting adventures held danger and he remembers that every time the Iraqi team did badly the leader of Iraqi sports, Saddam's son Uday Hussein, would order that everyone have their heads and eyebrows shaved and on at least one occasion, they were put in prison.

Uday had Sharif build him a world-class gym and develop a weightlifting program for him. Sharif supplied some supplements but Uday instead started abusing steroids.

Steroids affected him, he became an addict. The doctors said he should not mix alcohol and steroids, but he did and it drove him mad. He was trying to be a hero by taking more and more tablets. But he failed.

— Kadhem Sharif talking about Uday Hussein's drug use

Uday took up collecting motorcycles like Sharif, even stealing some from him. It was at this point that they had a falling out and Sharif refused to fix any of Uday's bikes. It was then that he was thrown in jail on trumped up charges and spent two years in Iraqi prisons.

== Firdos Square ==
On 9 April 2003 Sharif had his chance to take revenge. Hearing that the Saddam regime had fallen he took a 10 kg (22 lb) sledgehammer and went to work on the statue of Saddam Hussein that stood in Firdos Square in Baghdad. The square is directly in front of the Palestine Hotel where the world's journalists had been staying. Seeing a crowd and a story, the reporters and their cameras streamed out of the hotel and video taped the falling of Saddam Hussein's statue. While Sharif's actions with the sledgehammer only resulted in a small dent in the statue base and bloody hands, he does claim to have handed over the Iraqi flag that was placed on the statue.

== After the fall ==
The legality of Sharif's motorcycle business and collection has always been murky and he has admitted that some of his bikes were stolen in neighboring countries and smuggled into Iraq along with dealing with the bikes looted from Kuwait when Saddam Hussein invaded the country. His business finally caught up with him when in 2005 he was arrested in connection with dealing in stolen bikes.

In a 2016 interview, Kadhem said that he expressed his regret over his role in the Firdos Square statue destruction in which he attacked the statue with a sledgehammer. He said "Saddam has gone, but now in his place we have a 1,000 Saddam's." and "When I go past that statue, I feel pain and shame. I ask myself, why did I topple this statue. I'd like to put it back up, to rebuild it. I'd put it back up but I'm afraid I would be killed." He looked back to Saddam's time with nostalgia as "Saddam never executed people without a reason. He was as solid as a wall. There was no corruption or looting, it was safe. You could be safe." He went on to say that he hopes the two leaders viewed as responsible for the overthrow of Saddam, Tony Blair and George Bush, should be brought to justice.

== Bike collection ==
Kadhem had been a bike collector almost all his life but after the war his collection greatly expanded until he was arrested. In his collection there were a number of notable bike including:

- 1914 - This Norton was part of the escort of King Faisal I, Iraq's first monarch.
- 1947 - British-made BSA that he found rusting in a farm in "Anbar province", an area of western Iraq notorious for insurgent violence since the 2003 US-led invasion.
- 1957 British Norton motorcycle that Saddam Hussein the revolutionary rode when on the run after the assassination of then Iraqi President Abd al-Karim Qasim half a century ago.
- 1957 Rolls-Royce Silver Cloud, formerly the property of the Emir of Kuwait.
- Saddam's eldest son, Uday Hussein, became an invalid after he was seriously injured in a 1996 assassination attempt. Uday, also a collector of bikes, had his collection made into three-wheelers so he could still drive them. After Saddam's fall Kadhem was able to get his hands on all of Uday's monster three-wheeled invalid motorcycles.
