= Media coverage of the Iraq War =

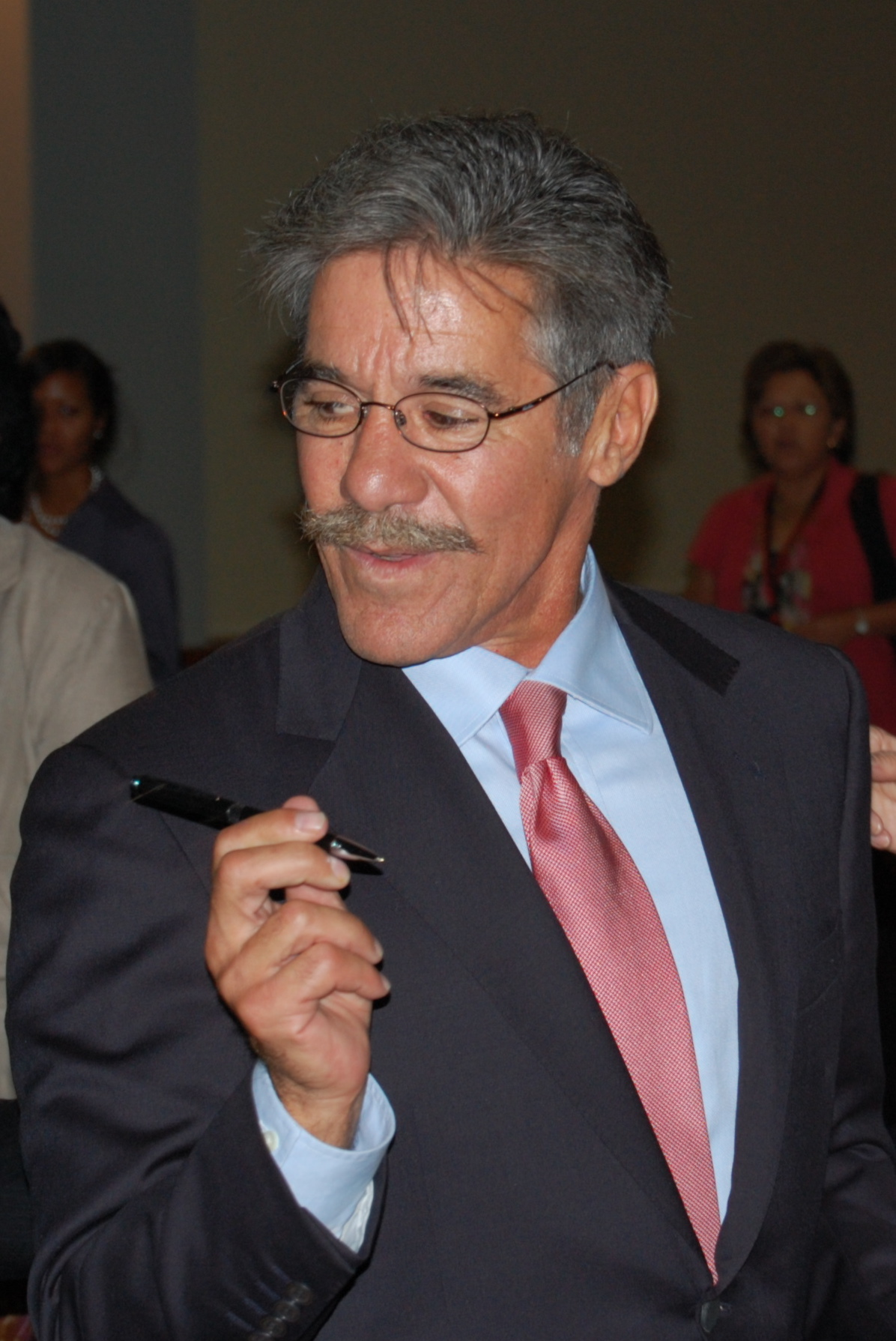
Journalist Geraldo Rivera who while with the 101st Airborne Division during war with Iraq in 2003 began to disclose an upcoming operation drawing a map in the sand for his audience.

The 2003 invasion of Iraq had unprecedented US media coverage, especially cable news networks. US media was largely uncritical of the war, with many viewers falsely believing that Saddam Hussein and Iraq were involved with the 9/11 attacks. British media was more cautious in its coverage. The Qatari Al-Jazeera network was heavily critical of the war.

== US mainstream media coverage ==
The most popular cable network in the United States for news on the war was Fox News, and had begun influencing other media outlets' coverage. At the time, Fox News was owned by Rupert Murdoch, a strong supporter of the war. On-screen during all live war coverage by Fox News was a waving flag animation in the upper left corner and the headline "Operation Iraqi Freedom" along the bottom. The network has shown the American flag animation in the upper-left corner since the September 11 attacks. A study conducted in 2003 by Fairness & Accuracy in Reporting (FAIR) tracking the frequencies of pro-war and antiwar commentators on the major networks found that pro-war views were overwhelmingly more frequent. The FAIR study found that the two networks notably least likely to present critical commentary were Fox and CBS.

Anti-war celebrities appearing frequently on news networks included actors Janeane Garofalo, Tim Robbins, Mike Farrell, Rob Reiner, Martin Sheen, Susan Sarandon and director Michael Moore. In a widely publicized story, the country music band Dixie Chicks ignited boycotts and record burnings in the US for their negative remarks about President Bush in a concert in London.

MSNBC also brought the American flag back on screen and regularly ran a tribute called "America's Bravest" which showed photographs sent by family members of troops deployed in Iraq. MSNBC also fired liberal Phil Donahue, a critic of Bush's Iraq policy, a month before the invasion began and replaced his show with an expanded Countdown: Iraq, initially hosted by Lester Holt. Shortly after Donahue's firing, MSNBC hired Michael Savage, a controversial conservative radio talk show host for a Saturday afternoon show. Although Donahue's show had lower ratings than several shows on other networks, and most reports on its cancellation blamed poor ratings, it was the highest-rated program on MSNBC's struggling prime time lineup at the time of its cancellation. In September 2002, Donahue's show averaged 365,000 viewers, compared to rival Connie Chung's 686,000 on CNN and Bill O'Reilly's 2 million on Fox News, according to Nielsen Media Research.

In overall numbers, Fox News was number one, followed by CNN, and then MSNBC. It was a major success for Fox News, as many had believed CNN would reclaim the top spot, since it established itself with coverage from the 1990-1991 Gulf War.

In separate incidents, at least three different Western reporters were fired or disciplined due to their actions in covering the war. Peter Arnett, an NBC and National Geographic correspondent, was fired for giving an interview with Iraqi officials in which he questioned the United States' role and saying the "first war plan had failed." Brian Walski of the Los Angeles Times was fired on March 31 for altering a photo of a British soldier warning Iraqi civilians to take cover from an Iraqi aerial bombing. Geraldo Rivera left Iraq after drawing a crude map in the sand during a live broadcast on Fox News, which raised concerns at the Pentagon that he was possibly revealing vital troop movements on air.

One study has compared the number of insurgent attacks in Iraq to the number of "anti-resolve" statements in the US media, the release of public opinion polls, and geographic variations in access to international media by Iraqis. The purpose was to determine if insurgents responded to information on "casualty sensitivity." The researchers found that insurgent attacks spiked by 5 to 10% after increases in the number of negative reports of the war in the media. The authors identified this as an "emboldenment effect" and concluded "insurgent groups respond rationally to expected probability of US withdrawal."

=== Criticisms of pro-invasion bias ===
A study found that in the lead up to the Iraq War, most sources were overwhelmingly in favor of the invasion.

A University of Maryland study on American public opinion found that:

- Fifty-seven percent of mainstream media viewers believed that Iraq gave substantial support to Al-Qaeda, or was directly involved in the September 11 attacks (48% after invasion).
- Sixty-nine percent believed that Saddam Hussein was personally involved in the September 11 attacks.
- Twenty-two percent believed that weapons of mass destruction had been found in Iraq. (Twenty-one percent believed that chem/bio weapons had actually been used against US soldiers in Iraq during 2003)
- In the composite analysis of the PIPA study, 80% of Fox News watchers had one or more of these perceptions, in contrast to 71% for CBS and 27% who tuned to NPR/PBS.

In an investigation of the news coverage of Colin Powell's 2003 UN address, rhetorical scholar John Oddo found that mainstream journalists "strengthened Powell's credibility, predisposed audiences to respond favorably to his discourse, and subtly altered his claims to make them seem more certain and warranted." In 2003, a study of the mainstream media released by Fairness and Accuracy In Reporting stated the network news disproportionately focused on pro-war sources and left out many anti-war sources. According to the study, 64% of guests on the studied networks were in favor of the Iraq War while total anti-war sources made up 10% of the guests (only 3% of US sources were anti-war). The study stated that "viewers were more than six times as likely to see a pro-war source as one who was anti-war; with US guests alone, the ratio increases to 25 to 1."

FAIR also conducted a similar study in February 2004. According to the study, which took place during October 2003, current or former government or military officials accounted for 76 percent of all 319 sources for news stories about Iraq which aired on network news channels.

Following the invasion, the editors of the New York Times apologized for its coverage of Hussein's alleged weapons programs, acknowledging that "we wish we had been more aggressive in re-examining the claims (related to Iraqi weapons programs) as new evidence emerged — or failed to emerge."

During the invasion, critics argued that the mainstream media unduly focused on optimistic events, such as the toppling of a Saddam Hussein statue in Firdos Square, which was staged with the help of the US military forces, thus downplaying more negative news developments. In particular, the mainstream media has been criticized for underreporting news about Iraqi civilian casualties, which are estimated to be anywhere between 100,000 and 650,000.

As the security situation in Iraq has worsened since the invasion, many journalists have found it increasingly difficult to report from Iraq without jeopardizing their lives. Some media outlets, unable to afford the cost of additional security, have even abandoned their bureaus in Baghdad. This trend has forced journalists to depend even more heavily on US military sources, which has led some critics to call into question the impartiality of their reports on events such as the Iraqi elections.

A post-2008 election poll by FactCheck.org found that 48% of Americans believe Hussein played a role in the 9/11 attacks; the group concluded that "voters, once deceived, tend to stay that way despite all evidence."

=== Use of propaganda ===
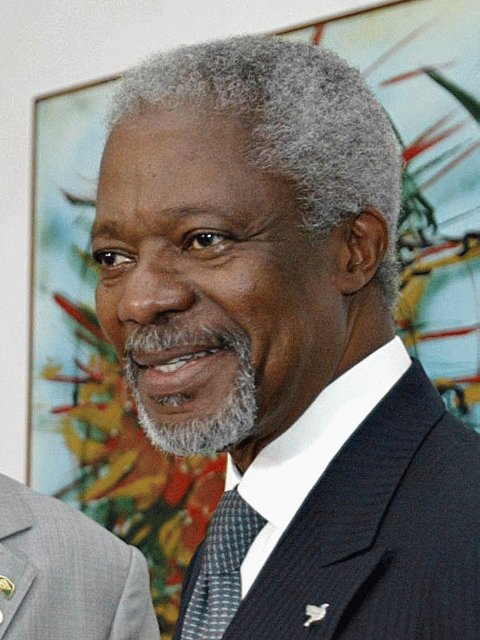
Kofi Annan and Richard Perle have said the Iraq War is illegal, but this was never mentioned in the US media aside from Fox News, MSNBC, and CNN.

Media critics such as Noam Chomsky have alleged that the media acted as propaganda for not questioning the legality of the Iraq war and, thus, took on the fundamental assumptions given by the government. This is despite overwhelming public opinion in favor of only invading Iraq with UN authorization.

In a 2010 interview, Chomsky compared media coverage of the Afghan War Diaries and lack of media coverage to a study of severe health problems in Fallujah. While there was ample coverage of the Afghan War Diaries there was no American coverage of the Fallujah study, in which the health situation in Fallujah was described by the British media as "worse than Hiroshima".

Chomsky also asserts that the media accurately covered events such as the Battle of Fallujah but because of an ideological bias, it acts as pro-government propaganda. In describing coverage of raid on Fallujah General Hospital he states that The New York Times, "accurately recorded the battle of Fallujah but it was celebrated...it was celebration of ongoing war crimes". The article in question was "Early Target of Offensive Is a Hospital".

It was revealed on October 2, 2016 that the Pentagon paid British PR firm Bell Pottinger $540mn to create fake terrorist videos, fake news articles for Arab news channels and propaganda videos.

An investigation by the Bureau of Investigative Journalism revealed the details of the multi-million pound operation. Bell Pottinger is understood to have been funded some $540million from the US Department of Defence (DoD) for five contracts from May 2007 to December 2011, according to the Times and the Bureau of Investigative Journalism. Lord Tim Bell, the former spin doctor to Margaret Thatcher, confirmed Bell Pottinger reported to the Pentagon, the CIA and the National Security Council on its work in Iraq.

=== Pentagon military analyst group ===
An investigation by the New York Times discovered that top Pentagon officials met with news analysts where they gave the analysts 'special information' and then tried to convince them to speak favorably about the Iraq war. The discovery was based on 8000 pages of secret information that had been revealed to The New York Times through a lawsuit under the Freedom of Information Act. The article states that top Pentagon officials would invite news analysts to secret meetings, and urge the analysts to speak positively of the war. Often, the US would give "classified information," trips, and contracts to the news analysts.

== US independent media coverage ==
The Media Workers Against the War and the Indymedia network, among many other independent networks including many journalists from the invading countries, provided reports in a way difficult to control by any government, corporation or political party. In the United States Democracy Now, hosted by Amy Goodman has been critical of the reasons for the 2003 invasion and the alleged crimes committed by the US authorities in Iraq.

Australian war artist George Gittoes collected independent interviews with soldiers while producing his documentary Soundtrack To War.

The war in Iraq provided the first time in history that military on the front lines were able to provide direct, uncensored reportage themselves, thanks to blogging software and the reach of the internet. Dozens of such reporting sites, known as soldier blogs or milblogs, were started during the war.

== Non-US media coverage ==
Non-US coverage sometimes differed strongly in tone and content from US media coverage.

In some countries television journalists' behavior differed significantly during the conflict compared to Gulf War conflicts. Jean-Marie Charon said most journalists were more cautious, often using the conditional form and rigorously citing sources.

The crew of HMS Ark Royal, Britain's flagship, demanded that the BBC be turned off on the ship because of what they saw as a clear anti-Coalition or "pro-Iraq" bias. One BBC correspondent had been embedded on the ship, but the crew said they had no complaints of his reporting specifically. The sailors on board the ship claimed that the BBC gave more credit to Iraqi reports than information coming from British or allied sources, often questioning and refusing to believe reports coming from Coalition sources while reporting Iraqi claims of civilian casualties without independent verification. The ship's news feed was replaced with Sky News. Ironically, it later emerged from a study conducted by Professor Justin Lewis of the School of Journalism at Cardiff University that the BBC was the most pro-war of British networks, a finding confirmed in a separate study by the German newspaper Frankfurter Allgemeine Zeitung.

The war in Iraq saw Abu Dhabi TV mature into a credible Al-Jazeera rival. However, the war did not benefit Al-Arabiya, the newest of Arabic news networks. Created by the Saudi audio-visual group MBC to compete with Al-Jazeera (whose tone often displeases Saudi leaders), Al-Arabiya was launched on February 19, 2003.

In Australia, the Seven Network launched a news bulletin in March 2003, titled "Target Iraq", covering the latest news from the crisis in the country. When the strike on Iraq ended, the bulletin was renamed Seven's 4:30 News (now Seven Afternoon News) and it became a permanent fixture on the Seven Network's schedule.

In Philippines, the ABS-CBN launched a news bulletin in March 2003, titled "ABS-CBN News Special Coverage: Iraq War 2003", covering the latest news from the crisis in the country. When the strike on Iraq War ended, the bulletin was renamed TV Patrol and it became a permanent fixture on the ABS-CBN's schedule.

== Iraqi media coverage ==
According to reports from three separate media watchdog groups, the Iraqi media was under tight state control prior to the invasion. Saddam Hussein's eldest son, Uday, oversaw as many as a dozen newspapers, sat on several important editorial boards, and ran the most popular television station, Youth TV. In a 2001 report, the French-based Committee to Protect Journalists wrote that Saddam Hussein's government maintained a "stranglehold" on Iraqi media outlets, and that "insulting the president or other government authorities is punishable by death."

In the wake of the invasion, the Iraqi media establishment changed drastically. Hundreds of newspapers, television stations, and radio stations sprouted both inside and outside of the country. Many of these new media outlets were closely linked with religious or political organizations, and closely reflected the interests of their backers. Some observers have suggested that this has contributed to increased sectarianism in the country.

The burgeoning Iraqi media market has also proven subject to manipulation by the United States government. In November 2005, the Los Angeles Times reported on a secret Pentagon program to pay Iraqi media outlets to publish articles favorable of the US invasion and occupation. This initiative relied on US-based subcontractors such as the Lincoln Group to write and place stories with headlines such as "Iraqis Insist on Living Despite Terrorism" and "More Money Goes to Iraq's Development." According to anonymous sources within the US government, Army Lt. Gen. John R. Vines oversees the program. In March 2006, General George Casey, the Army's second in command, indicated that this practice, which did not "violate US law or Pentagon guidelines," would continue.

== "Embedded" reporters ==
Around 600 journalists were "embedded" with military units, 80% being British or American. The Pentagon established the policy of "embedding" reporters with military units.

Robert Entman, professor of communication at the George Washington University and critic of mainstream media for decades, indicated it was a very wise tactic from the Pentagon. He mentioned there were more chances for the journalists to make favorable reports whilst in Iraq with British and American soldiers than if they had been asking questions in Washington. Entman indicated there is a natural cultural bias of American journalists in favor of military troops of their own country and that journalists do like to satisfy the government upon which they rely for information, as well as the public on whom they depend commercially. Entman also mentioned the high number of retired generals making comments on TV, pointing out these could not be considered independent experts as they were still paid by the government. He claims the British Broadcasting Corporation was much more neutral and informative on cultural and historical background than most American television reports.

The Ministry of Defense (MoD) explained "maintaining morale as well as information dominance will rank as important as physical protection". An MoD-commissioned commercial analysis of the print output produced by embeds shows that 90% of their reporting was either "positive or neutral."

== Firdos Square controversy ==
On April 9, 2003, a large statue of Saddam Hussein in Baghdad's Firdos Square, directly in front of the Palestine Hotel where the world's journalists had been quartered, was toppled by a US M88 tank recovery vehicle surrounded by dozens of celebrating Iraqis, who had been attempting to pull down the statue earlier with little success. One such futile attempt by sledgehammer wielding weightlifter Kadhem Sharif particularly caught media attention. Eventually the M88 was able to topple the statue which was jumped upon by Iraqi citizens who then decapitated the head of the statue and dragged it through the streets of the city hitting it with their shoes. The destruction of the statue was shown live on cable news networks as it happened and made the front pages of newspapers and covers of magazines all over the world - symbolizing the fall of the Saddam government. The images of the statue falling came as a shock to many Arab viewers, who had thought that Iraq was winning the war.

Before the statue was toppled, Marine Corporal Edward Chin of the 3rd battalion 4th Marines regiment climbed the ladder and placed an American flag over the statue's face. An Iraqi flag was then placed over the statue. The event was widely publicized, but allegations that it had been staged were soon published. One picture from the event, published in the London Evening Standard, was allegedly doctored to make the crowd appear larger. A report by the Los Angeles Times stated it was an unnamed Marine colonel, not Iraqi civilians who had decided to topple the statue; and that a quick-thinking Army psychological operations team then used loudspeakers to encourage Iraqi civilians to assist and made it all appear spontaneous and Iraqi-inspired. According to Tim Brown at Globalsecurity.org: "It was not completely stage-managed from Washington, DC but it was not exactly a spontaneous Iraqi operation."

The 2004 film Control Room deals with the incident in depth and indicated that the overall impression of Al Jazeera reporters was that it was staged. The Marines present at the time, 3rd Battalion 4th Marines, maintain that the scene was not staged other than the assistance they provided.

== Coverage of US casualties ==
Media coverage of US military casualties has been met by Bush administration efforts to downplay reports about soldiers' deaths throughout the invasion. Unlike the Vietnam War, when the media regularly published photographs of flag-draped coffins of American military personnel killed in action, the Bush administration prohibited the release of such photographs during the Iraq invasion. This ban mirrors a similar ban put in place during the Gulf War, though it appears to have been enforced less tightly during previous military operations.

According to Senator Patrick Leahy, the administration also scheduled the return of wounded soldiers to Dover Air Force Base for after midnight so that the press would not see them. This practice was documented by both the Drudge Report and Salon.com. A number of Dover photographs were eventually released in response to a Freedom of Information request filed by blogger Russ Kick.

Media coverage related to casualty milestones, such as the 1000th, 2000th, and 3000th US soldier killed, have consistently sparked controversy among supporters and defenders of the invasion. On September 7, 2004 the US recorded its 1,000th casualty of the war, when four servicemen died that day (three in one incident, one in another). Presidential candidate John Kerry called it a "tragic milestone." Defense Secretary Donald Rumsfeld argued the 1000th milestone was passed long ago in the war on terrorism, with the loss of life on September 11, 2001 being in the thousands, and going on the offensive against terrorism "has its cost."

On October 25, 2005 the Department of Defense announced the 2,000th US death from the war as Staff Sergeant George T. Alexander Jr., who was killed when a roadside bomb detonated near his M2 Bradley in the city of Samarra. In response, Senators including Dick Durbin made statements opposing the war, and activists held six hundred anti-war protests and candlelight vigils across the United States.

In contrast, The Pentagon downplayed the death; Lt. Col. Steven Boylan, chief spokesman for the US military in Iraq, told the Associated Press that "the 2,000 service members killed in Iraq supporting Operation Iraqi Freedom is not a milestone. It is an artificial mark on the wall set by individuals or groups with specific agendas and ulterior motives."

The US death toll reached 3,000 on December 31, 2006 when Texas soldier Spc. Dustin R. Donica was killed in Baghdad, near the office of Saleh al-Mutlaq, a Sunni Arab politician and leader of the Iraqi National Dialogue Front. The milestone came just one day after the execution of Saddam Hussein and just as the Bush Administration was revising its wartime strategy.

As of May 29, 2012, according to the US Department of Defense casualty website, there were 4,409 total deaths.

=== Ban lifted ===
Soon after taking office in January 2009, President Barack Obama asked Defense Secretary Robert Gates to review the ban on media coverage of coffins. In February Gates announced that the ban would be lifted, and permission for coverage of individual soldiers would be at the discretion of their next of kin. On 5 April the return of Phillip Myers, an Air Force Staff Sergeant killed in Afghanistan the day before, became the first return of a US serviceman's remains to receive media coverage since the instatement of the original ban in 1991.

== Bombing of Al Jazeera office ==
On April 8, 2003, US aircraft bombed the Baghdad bureau of Qatar satellite TV station Al Jazeera killing a journalist and wounding another despite the US being informed of the office's precise coordinates prior to the incident. An Al Jazeera correspondent said that very clear, yellow signs reading "Press" covered the building from all sides and on the roof. A US Central Command spokesman said that the station "was not and never had been a target." The US government had repeatedly criticized Al Jazeera as "endangering the lives of American troops."

The attack had drawn particular criticism because the Kabul office of Al Jazeera had been bombed in the US invasion of Afghanistan.

On 2 April 2003, in a speech given in New York City, British Home Secretary David Blunkett commented on what he believed to be sympathetic and corrupt reporting of Iraq by Arab news sources. He told the audience that "It's hard to get the true facts if the reporters of Al Jazeera are actually linked into, and are only there because they are provided with facilities and support from, the régime." His speech came only hours before Al Jazeera was ejected from Baghdad by the US occupation.

A top secret memo leaked by a British civil servant and a parliamentary researcher detailed a lengthy conversation on April 16, 2004 between Prime Minister Blair and President Bush, in which Bush according to British media allegedly proposed bombing the Qatar central office of Al Jazeera. House press secretary, Scott McClellan, describing it as "outlandish" said, "Any such notion that we would engage in that kind of activity is just absurd." A UK government official suggested that the Bush threat had been "humorous, not serious." Another source said Bush was "deadly serious." The UK government refuses to publish the memo and two civil servants have been charged with violating Britain's Official Secrets Act for allegedly disclosing the document. For a more full discussion, see Al Jazeera bombing memo.

== Attack on Palestine Hotel ==
On the same day as the destruction of the Baghdad bureau of Al Jazeera, a US tank fired a HEAT round at what the US military later said was a suspected Iraqi forward artillery observer. Due to what the US states was a communications error, the tank fired at the Palestine Hotel, where approximately 100 international reporters in Baghdad were based, instead of the correct building, killing two journalists, Taras Protsyuk of Reuters and Jose Couso of the Spanish network Telecinco and wounding three other correspondents.

After interviewing "about a dozen reporters who were at the scene, including two embedded journalists who monitored the military radio traffic before and after the shelling occurred" the Committee to Protect Journalists said the facts suggested "that attack on the journalists, while not deliberate, was avoidable." The Committee to Protect Journalists went on to say that "Pentagon officials, as well as commanders on the ground in Baghdad, knew that the Palestine Hotel was full of international journalists and were intent on not hitting it". It is not clear that orders not to fire upon the hotel had actually made it to the tank level. Reporters Without Borders demanded proof from Donald Rumsfeld that incidents "were not deliberate attempts to dissuade the media from reporting." Amnesty International demanded independent investigation.

== Journalist casualties ==
More journalists were killed during the US-led invasion and occupation of Iraq than in any war in history. The Committee to Protect Journalists research shows that "at least 150 journalists and 54 media support workers were killed in Iraq from the US-led invasion in March 2003 to the declared end of the war in December 2011."

There were a number of journalist casualties during the invasion, including fourteen deaths (some not directly war-related). Michael Kelly, an influential reporter, columnist, and editor, died in a Humvee accident on April 3, 2003. NBC's David Bloom died of a blood clot three days later. Both Kelly and Bloom were embedded with the US Army's 3rd Infantry Division.

ITN reporter Terry Lloyd, who originally broke the news that Saddam Hussein had used chemical weapons, was killed by US forces near Basra on March 22, 2003.

== Critical journalists ==
Knight Ridder journalists Jonathan Landay and Warren Strobel wrote a series of critical articles in the months before the invasion questioning the need for war and criticizing the intelligence behind it. Charles J. Hanley of the Associated Press, reporting from on the scene in Iraq with UN inspectors, made clear there was no evidence of WMD. In one article, on January 18, 2003, he reported that the 13 "facilities of concern" cited by US and British intelligence had been inspected repeatedly with no violations found. All three journalists were featured in Bill Moyers' 2007 special PBS report "Buying the War."

Journalist Peter Arnett was fired by MSNBC and National Geographic after he declared in an interview with the Iraqi information ministry that he believed the US strategy of "shock and awe" had failed. He also went on to tell Iraqi State TV that he had told "Americans about the determination of the Iraqi forces, the determination of the government, and the willingness to fight for their country," and that reports from Baghdad about civilian deaths had helped antiwar protesters undermine the Bush administration's strategy. The interview was given 10 days before the fall of Baghdad.

== See also ==
- Military–industrial–media complex
- Propaganda in the United States
- Propaganda model
- Rationale for the Iraq War
- United States news media and the Vietnam War
- Media coverage of the Gulf War
- Outfoxed (2004)
