= Dolores Al Shelleh =

Jordanian mountaineer

Personal information
- Nationality: Jordanian
- Citizenship: Jordanian

Climbing career
- Major ascents: First Jordanian woman to Summit Mount Everest

Dolores Al Shelleh is a Jordanian-Serbian mountaineer with Palestinian roots father side. She is an ESG Activist who currently lives in Dubai, UAE. She was the first woman from Jordan to summit the Mount Everest, which she achieved in 2019, a year which marked many deadly Mount Everest expeditions.

== Career ==
She successfully climbed Kilimanjaro in Africa, Mera Peak in Nepal, and Elbrus in Europe. She was the first Arab person to climb Mount Manaslu, which is located in the Himalayas.

In April 2019, she embarked her Everest expedition and she successfully climbed the Mount Everest on 23 May 2019, attempting from the Northeast ridge of Tibet. She became the first Jordanian woman and second Serbian woman to achieve this. Dolores also became the first Arab woman to successfully climb Mount Everest from the Northeast ridge. She also filmed her journey to the Everest herself, and released it as a documentary titled The Lone Sheوحدها إلى القمة, which premiered on the National Geographic Abu Dhabi on 8 March 2020, coinciding with the International Women's Day.

She also works as an advocate with The Sustainable City to raise awareness regarding the Sustainable Development Goals implemented by the United Nations including the climate change.
