= Abu Dhabi TV =

Emirati television channel

- Logo used since 2023
- Country: United Arab Emirates
- Broadcast area: Arab world Europe; Americas; Australia
- Network: Abu Dhabi Media
- Headquarters: Abu Dhabi, United Arab Emirates

Programming
- Language: Arabic
- Picture format: 1080p MPEG-4 HDTV

Ownership
- Owner: Government of Abu Dhabi
- Sister channels: Drama TV; AD Sports; Yas Sports; Edge Sport; Majid Kids TV

History
- Launched: 4 August 1969; 57 years ago

Links
- Website: adtv.ae

Availability

Terrestrial
- Digital terrestrial television (United Arab Emirates): Channel 62 (Abu Dhabi)

Streaming media
- ADTV Catch-Up: Watch online (HD)
- YouTube: Watch online (SD)

Abu Dhabi TV (Arabic: قناة أبوظبي) is an Emirates-based television channel that was originally launched in 1969. It broadcasts content from Abu Dhabi, the capital of the United Arab Emirates, and is owned by Abu Dhabi Media.

Abu Dhabi TV is managed by the Abu Dhabi Media. It is managed through its previous attachment to the Ministry of Information and Culture since 1999 and current attachment to Abu Dhabi Media since February 2006, when the ministry was scrapped.

Abu Dhabi TV presents news bulletins every three hours. Abu Dhabi TV broadcasts content throughout the Arab world, Europe, Americas, and Australia.

== History and re-branding ==
Abu Dhabi Television started grayscale broadcasts on 4 August 1969 using equipment provided by British company Thomson Television International, later adopting the PAL format for color broadcasting on 4 December 1974. The station was only carried terrestrially in the United Arab Emirates for its first 23 years on the air. At launch, it only had one transmitter in Abu Dhabi proper on VHF channel 5, followed by the installation of a relay station at Al Ain in October 1971 on channel 7. Around this time, the network signed on at 6:30pm and signed off at midnight. By 1976, the channel now opened at 6pm. The Abu Dhabi TV satellite channel began regular broadcasts on 15 November 1992 on Arabsat A1; broadcasts were later transferred to Arabsat A2. The network also began to be carried through the entire Arabian Peninsula at that time.

The network was rebranded on 30 January 2000 as a service aimed at the Arabic-speaking diaspora. Under this format, the channel began carrying a wide range of news programs, as well as entertainment programs catered to Arabic audiences; as a result, it began to become competitive against rival networks MBC and Dubai TV. One of the network's most popular programs was the game show Waznak Dahab; the program premiered on 16 September 2002 and was canceled in early 2003 due to the invasion of Iraq by the United States, which resulted in the beginning of the Iraq War.

On 6 October 2008, Abu Dhabi TV (then-renamed Abu Dhabi Al Oula) was re-branded with a new logo, theme and new original programming content. This re-branding involved the launches of a website involving catch-ups of television programs and a 1080i high definition broadcast channel; which then featured bespoke idents in contrast to the standard-definition cast. The new themes were produced by graphic designer Lambie Nairn and the soundtrack was made by David Lowe, who produced the famous BBC News themes. The rebrand also involved the launch of 'Abu Dhabi Sports', a group of eight sister channels (broadcast in either Arabic or English) with the inclusion of 'EDGE Sports' and 'YAS Sports'; all of which are currently broadcast 24/7. The rebrand was also used to counter the rise in copycat rebrand across Arabia, aiming to distinguish Abi Dhabi TV as being "best in class".

In the same year, President Khalifa bin Zayed Al Nahyan issued a decree ordering Abu Dhabi TV to be established as a public joint-stock company that is wholly owned by the government of Abu Dhabi.

In 2009, Abu Dhabi Media relaunched and rebranded 'Emirates TV' as 'Abu Dhabi Al Emarat' after acquiring the network in 2007. Additionally, a UAE-based channel of National Geographic was launched on 1 July of the same year.

On 5 April 2010, the sister channel Abu Dhabi Drama was launched, offering free-to-air broadcasts of drama and soap opera television programs broadcast 24/7 without advertisement breaks. On 13 February 2012, Abu Dhabi TV shut down its analogue broadcasts on terrestrial television and began broadcasting solely in high definition while existing standard definition casts were down-converted.

On 22 March 2015, the network was once again rebranded back to the 'Abu Dhabi TV' name with a brand new logo and identity.

On 19 February 2020, Abu Dhabi TV unveiled its new logo after 5 years in use. It is now co-owned by the National Geographic Society/The Walt Disney Company & Abu Dhabi Media Company. The latter is also responsible for launching the Arabic version of the National Geographic magazine.

On 19 September 2023, Abu Dhabi TV unveiled its new logo after three years of the old one.

== Sister channels ==
Abu Dhabi TV is additionally paired with sister channels such as Abu Dhabi Al Emarat (Emirates TV), Abu Dhabi Al Riyadiya (Abu Dhabi Sports TV), "Abu Dhabi Drama" (Abu Dhabi Drama TV) and Abu Dhabi Al Oula +1, a 1-hour time shifted variant of the station.
