= Side letter (contract law) =

Agreements made outside the primary contract

A side letter or side agreement or side letter arrangement is an agreement that is not part of the underlying or primary contract or agreement, and which some or all parties to the contract use to reach agreement on issues the primary contract does not cover or for which they require clarification, or to amend the primary contract. Under the law of contracts, a side letter has the same force as the underlying or primary contract. However, the validity of side letters has been denied by some courts in specific circumstances. Side letters are often used in financial or property transactions, or other commercial contracts. They are usually in the form of a letter signed by parties signatory to the primary contract but can also be an oral agreement. As part of a business organization's governance strategy, side letters should be under similar controls to any other contractual agreement, as they can have significant financial or operational impact, or expose the organization to risks of many types.

Side letters may also be used in relation to private fund contracts, for example a particular investor may wish to vary the terms of a limited partnership agreement with respect to that particular investor. An investor might be seeking more favourable terms under the contract or might need the side letter to enter the venture under terms to meet regulatory requirements.

In Barbudev v Eurocom Cable Management Bulgaria Eood and others (2011), the High Court decided that a side letter provided an opportunity to invest on terms to be agreed, and was therefore an "agreement to agree", not a binding contract. The Court of Appeal later upheld the ruling.
