= Majid (comics) =

Pan-Arab comic book anthology

- Logo used since September 2023

Publication information
- Publisher: Abu Dhabi Media Network
- Schedule: Monthly (since February 2020); Weekly (until January 2020)
- Format: Ongoing series
- Publication date: February 1979
- No. of issues: 176,500+

Majid (Arabic: ماجد) is a pan-Arab comic book anthology and children's magazine published in Abu Dhabi, United Arab Emirates by the Abu Dhabi Media Network. Since its publication in 1979, it has been circulated region-wide, within and beyond Arab states of the Persian Gulf, breaking sales' records with a circulation of 176500 weekly copies at one point in time, according to the Audit Bureau of Circulation. Many regarded Majid as a representation of the Arab comic golden age. It is held in high regard along with the Egyptian comic Samir, and its Saudi counterpart Basim.

== History and development ==
Majid is issued by the Abu Dhabi Media Company; a governmental institution of the United Arab Emirates, and was first managed by the Egyptian journalist and bibliophile Ahmad Omar. Majid started as a supplement of Al-Ittihad newspaper, distributing 5000 copies along with the first issue of the paper, before branching into its own publication. Its title (which also refers to the titular mascot usually displayed besides the nameplate, an 11-year-old boy donning the Emirati headwear) is reportedly an homage to the historic Arab sailor Ahmad Ibn Majid, a local of the Emirate of Jilfar. Other "early" attempts at names were (Hamdan), another popular Emirati name, and (Dana)

Majid has been in circulation and has been released every Wednesday on a weekly basis since 28 February 1979 until the end of 2019. It switched to a monthly release format in 2022, possibly in relation to the decrease of "hardcopy" consumption since the 1970s, the technological media alternatives, the financial and promotional difficulties, and the general decline of interest in children magazine within the Arab world

In 2009, Majid magazine launched its official website, featuring character profiles, songs, and integrated videos from their television channel. The magazine ventured into television production with the launch of its television station in 2015, managed by the Emirate director and self-proclaimed lifelong reader of the magazine, Mariam Al Sirkal.

The TV channel features animated versions of the characters. The initiative, according to the founders, aims to catapult the character of Majid to "the digital age", and to maintain the traditional, familial values of the Arab world. The channel was later accompanied by a mobile application containing games as well as educational content targeting the 2-16 demographic.

In February 2020, with the publication of its 2,136th issue, the magazine had undergone an artistic makeover by the Lebanese creative agency Studio Safar, who stated in a tweet that "It's been a dream to work on the design of a magazine we grew up reading.⁣"

In 2021, Majid decided to enter the digital market by launching its mobile App titled "Majid Universe", compatible to the IOS system, Google Play, Android, and Apple. The "Monthly subscription allows users to stream over 800 hours of exclusive and new content, live and animated shows, games, and digital magazines" . The App also integrated other productions of the Abu Dhabi Media Company not necessarily related to the magazine, like the animated children show Mansour, and its predecessor Freej.

During the COVID-19 pandemic, the magazine issued an official tweet stating that it will temporarily cease distribution outside of the United Arab Emirates, offering instead to mail the issues to its readers.

As of 2023, The Majid Universe app was now discontinued, due to the channel's rebrand, and most Majid assests we're moved to ADtv

== Characters ==
Majid Magazine boasts a number of characters; some more recent than others as the magazine updates its lineup. However, Majid does maintain its original cast, some of which are staples while others have appeared and disappeared throughout the years.

=== Original and early characters ===
==== Kaslan Jiddan ====
Kaslan Jiddan
- Majid character
- First appearance: 1979
- Created by: Abu Dhabi Media Network

In-universe information
- Species: Human
- Gender: Male
- Religion: Islam
- Nationality: United Arab Emirates

Kaslan Jiddan (Arabic: كسلان جداً lit.Very Lazy); who's considered one of the magazine's most favored characters. Kaslan is a loving but ditzy boy who tries to act like an adult, usually getting into several misadventures. Later into the series, Kaslan gains a baby brother, Nasheet Jiddan (Very Active). The character first appeared in 1979.

==== Zakiya al thakiyya ====
Zakiya Al Thakiyya / Zakiya the Intelligent (Arabic: زكيّة الذكيّة), a smart well-mannered girl who acts as an informational surrogate to the reader, with her stories usually providing valuable insight into science and other topics, however her TV counterpart fights off villains including a gigantic burger.

==== Moza ====
Moza, which is a direct translation of the popular American comic strip Nancy, with the character of Sluggo (Named Rashood in the Arab version) being reintroduced as her brother rather than her friend, to adhere to the conservative nature of Arab societies. The strip was typically featured at the back-cover, and was titled The Lovely Mouza and Her Brother Rashoud (Arabic: موزة الحبوبة وشقيقها رشود).

==== Captain Khalfan and the criminal investigation team ====
Captain Khalfan and the Criminal Investigation Team (Arabic: النقيب خلفان وفريق البحث الجنائي); featuring the titular captain and his comic relief assistant Fahman. Later in the series, the team gains a new lieutenant, named Mariam. Mariam being a woman was a fairly ground-breaking feminist initiative of the magazine at the time.

==== Shamsa & Dana ====
Shamsa & Dana (Arabic: شمسة و دانة); first conceived in 1979 by Egyptian husband and wife team Eihab Shakir (illustrator) and his wife Samira Shafiq (writer). The strip tells the story of two 12-year-old girls living on an island, their daily comedic occurrences with their surroundings and the friendly creatures around them.

==== Fudhooli ====
Fudhooli (Arabic: فضولي lit.Curious); one of the most prominent characters of the publication. Fudhooli is a character with no particular narrative that holds the sole function of hiding within the illustrations of the comic book, similarly to the British character Waldo. The magazine urges reader to engage in the weekly contest of "finding Fudhooli", who sometimes has his faced disguised or obscured.

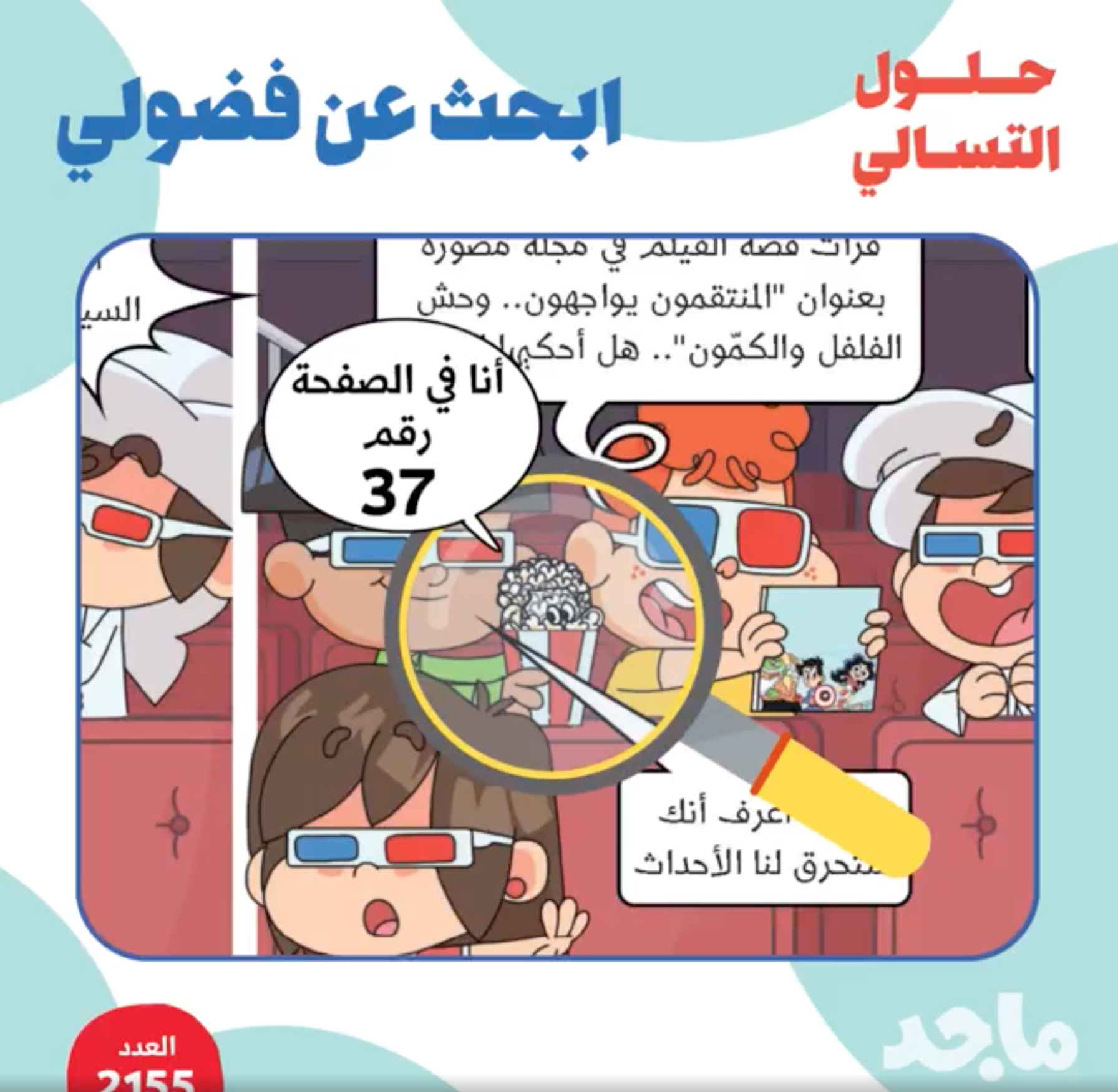

=== Recent characters ===
- The Tales of Aunty Osha (Arabic: سوالف خالتي عوشة), detailing the folk tales of an old Emiratti woman, usually a gateway into illustrations of the tales themselves.
- Fist of the Wind, Jujitsu Boy (Arabic: قبضة الريح، فتى الجوجتسو), which tells of the adventures of an 13 year old martial artist Shaheen
- Sea Fox the Pirate (Arabic: القرصان ثعلب البحر), the misadventures of a sea pirate and his loving mother
- Thunder and Lightning (Arabic: برق و رعد), the comedic antics of two stable horses.

== Legacy and cultural impact ==
Majid is nostalgically regarded by the 80s generation of readers in the Arab world, who today purchase and collect vintage copies of the magazine. A recent poll of the magazine also revealed that %20 of readers were actually over 18 years of age

Journalist Sarah Darwish, of the popular Egyptian newspaper The Seventh Day, described Majid as a magazine that had "shaped the childhood of an entire generation of 80s kids... the hand drawn works and the contributions from the most esteemed of writers and artists had turned it into the best magazine for boys and girls all over the Arab world"

In 2022, the magazine was put under investigation from the Emirati authorities for a cartoon that could be interpreted as allegedly promoting homosexuality, which is forbidden by Islamic law and by the laws of the United Arab Emirates
