= Gulf News Broadcasting =

Radio broadcasting company in UAE

Gulf News Broadcasting, along with Gulf News newspaper, is part of GN Media, from Al Nisr Publishing.

== Networks ==
The core radio networks under the GN Broadcasting umbrella comprise 2 English language stations - Radio 1 (104.1FM Dubai & 100.5FM Abu Dhabi) and Radio 2 (99.3FM Dubai and 106FM Abu Dhabi), plus Hayat FM 95.6 broadcast in Arabic and Josh 97.8FM, broadcasting Bollywood hits in Hindi. The radio stations also maintain an online presence through websites and smartphone applications, and an active social media following. The Company later shut down its operations under the Al Nisr Publishing banner and has since been bought over by the AbuDhabi Media Group.

Under GNB Radio2 they have had award-winning presenters like Rob Duckworth from Australia who hosted the Duckworth, Daisy and little bits of Rakesh show. Radio1 simultaneously had noteworthy presenters like Danny Cee and Sheena
