= Saddam Hussein statue destruction =

2003 Iraqi political event

Coordinates: 33.31442°N 44.42084°E

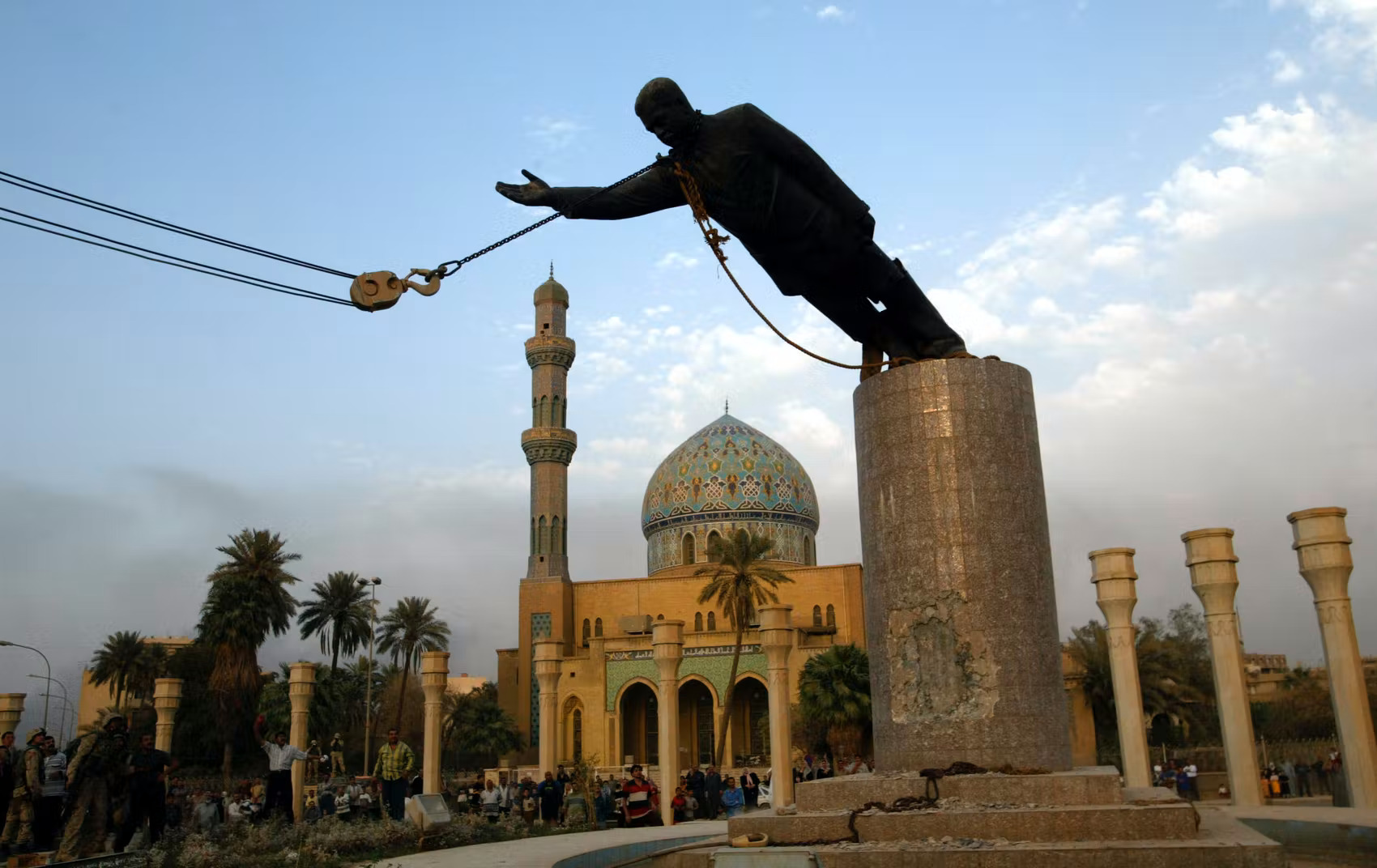
The toppling of Saddam Hussein's statue in Firdos Square in Baghdad shortly after the invasion of Iraq in 2003

On 9 April 2003, during the U.S. invasion of Iraq, a large statue of Saddam Hussein in Baghdad's Firdos Square was destroyed by Iraqi civilians and United States Marines. The event received global media coverage, wherein it came to symbolize the end of Saddam's rule in Iraq.

U.S. government officials and journalists, citing footage of jubilant Iraqis jumping on and sledgehammering the statue, claimed the event symbolized a victory for the United States. However, the development of an Iraqi insurgency undermined this narrative. A retrospective analysis by ProPublica and The New Yorker concluded that the media had exaggerated both the size and enthusiasm of the crowd, had influenced the crowd's behavior, and subsequently had turned the event into "a visual echo chamber" that promoted an unrealistically optimistic account of the invasion at the expense of more important news stories.

== Significance ==
In April 2002, the 12 m (39 ft) statue was erected in honor of Saddam Hussein's official 65th birthday.

In the afternoon of 9 April 2003, a group of Iraqi civilians began to attack the statue. One such futile attempt by sledgehammer-wielding weightlifter Kadhem Sharif Al-Jabbouri caught media attention. Shortly after, an advance unit of the United States Marine Corps from the 3rd Battalion, 4th Marines arrived at Firdos Square, secured the area, and contacted the foreign journalists who had been quartered in the Palestine Hotel at the square. Following a couple of hours, the U.S. Marines toppled the statue with an M88 armored recovery vehicle.

According to the book Shooter, the first plan was to attach a cable between the M88 and the statue's torso area. Someone pointed out that if the cable snapped, it might whiplash and kill people. The alternate method chosen was to wrap a chain around the neck. Eventually, the M88 was able to topple the statue, which was jumped and stomped upon by Iraqi citizens, who then decapitated the statue and dragged it through the streets of the city, hitting it with their shoes. The destruction of the statue was shown live on cable news networks as it happened and made the front pages of newspapers and covers of magazines throughout the world – symbolizing the fall of Saddam's government. The images of the statue's destruction provided a clear refutation of Information Minister Muhammad Saeed al-Sahhaf's reports that Iraq had been winning the war.

A green sculpture by Bassem Hamad al-Dawiri, meant to symbolize the unity of Iraq, was installed on the empty plinth in June 2003 and remained there until it was removed and demolished in 2013.

== Flags ==
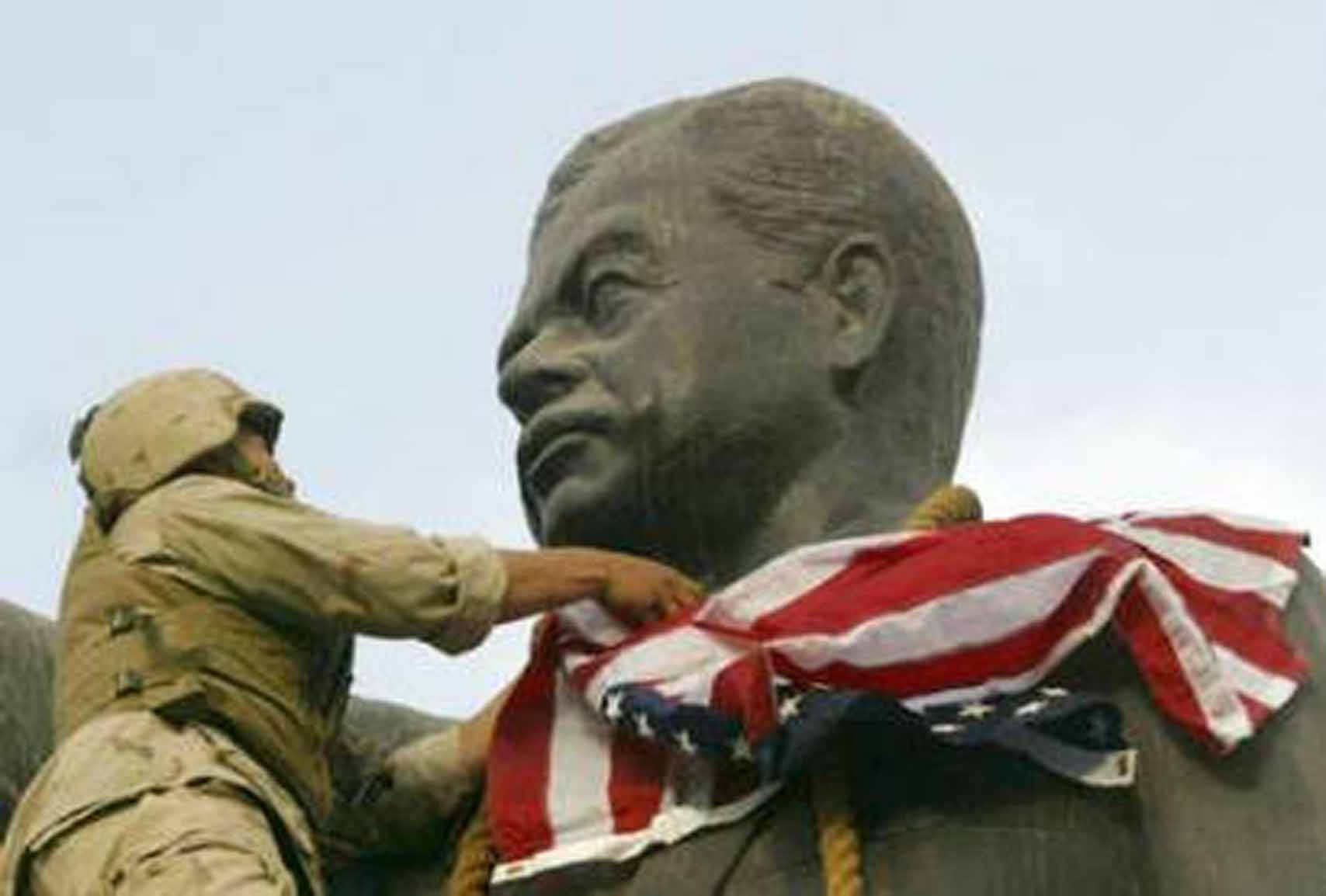
The face of the statue being covered by the American flag

Before the statue was toppled, Marine Corporal Edward Chin of the 1st Tank Battalion, 1st Marine Division (attached to the 3rd Battalion, 4th Marines) climbed the ladder and placed a U.S. flag over the statue's face. According to the book Shooter, by Coughlin, Kuhlman, and Davis, other Marines of the 3/4 realized the PR disaster unfolding as the formerly cheering crowd became silent, with one woman shouting at the Marines to remove the flag. Kuhlman had appropriated an Iraqi flag (thought to be provided by a citizen) as a war trophy during a raid earlier in the war and quickly unfurled it and headed for the statue. The crowd grabbed this flag and then placed it over the statue. The flag swapping is thought to be made so it doesn't look as an "occupation" by foreign forces but actually a "liberation".

== Conflicting reports ==
The event was widely publicized, but allegations that it had been staged were soon published. One picture from the event, published in the Evening Standard, was digitally altered to suggest a larger crowd. A report by the Los Angeles Times stated it was an unnamed Marine colonel, not Iraqi civilians, who had decided to topple the statue and that a quick-thinking Army psychological operations team then used loudspeakers to encourage Iraqi civilians to assist and made it all appear spontaneous and Iraqi-inspired. Tim Brown at GlobalSecurity.org stated: "It was not completely stage-managed from Washington, DC, but it was not exactly a spontaneous Iraqi operation."

The Marines present at the time, the 3rd Battalion, 4th Marines, 3rd Assault Amphibian Battalion, and the 1st Tank Battalion, maintain that the scene was not staged other than the assistance they provided.

Robert Fisk described the event as "the most staged photo opportunity since Iwo Jima."

== Legacy ==
The toppling of Saddam's statue has been compared to an earlier incident during the Hungarian Revolution of 1956 when a statue of Stalin was "decapitated" and ultimately torn down to its "boots."

Kadhem Sharif Al-Jabbouri, who helped topple Saddam's statue with a sledgehammer, told BBC News in 2016 that he regretted his part in the event. Al-Jabbouri was a motorcycle mechanic for Saddam who came to despise Saddam's regime after being imprisoned for almost two years for falling out of favor and having around 15 family members killed by the regime. After helping topple the statue, he was disheartened to see the arriving Marines from 3/4 cover its face with an American flag, and he claims he gave them the Iraqi flag and insisted they use it instead. He eventually became critical of the subsequent Coalition governance of Iraq, which he described as marked by worsening "infighting, corruption, killing, [and] looting" and, in short, "Saddam has gone, but now in his place, we have 1,000 Saddams." Al-Jabbouri told BBC that he would like the statue of Saddam to be replaced and that he would erect one himself but feared reprisals for it.

In Bangladesh, on the day of prime minister Sheikh Hasina's 2024 resignation, protesters climbed up and vandalized the golden statue of Sheikh Mujib at the Mrityunjayee Prangan. The statue was entirely demolished by the afternoon. The statue's toppling was compared with that of Saddam Hussein's statue.

Following the fall of Ba'athist Syria, various statues of Hafez al-Assad were toppled; these de-commemorations were likened to the toppling of Saddam Hussein's statues.

== See also ==
- De-Ba'athification
- De-commemoration
- Sheikh Mujibur Rahman statue destruction
