= Al-Rusafa, Iraq =

Rusafah ٱلرُّصَافَة ٱلرَّصَافَة Al-Rasafah
- Neighbourhood
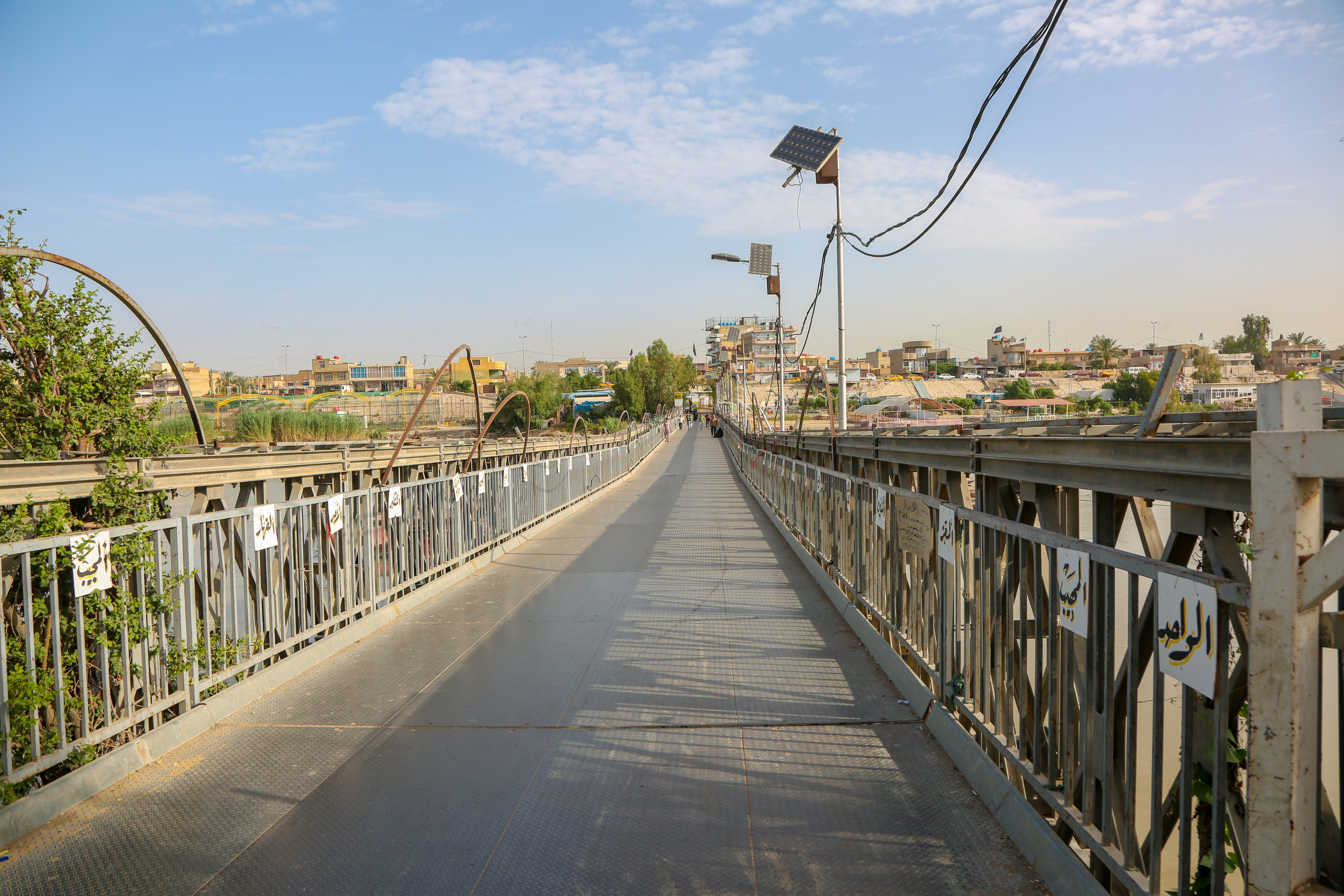

- Rusafah's location inside Iraq Rusafah (Iraq) Rusafah (Middle East) Rusafah (Asia)
- Coordinates: 33°19′54″N 44°24′55″E
- Country: Iraq
- Governorate: Baghdad

Area
  - Total: 208 km^{2} (80 sq mi)

Population (2018)
  - Total: 550,417
  - Density: 2,650/km^{2} (6,850/sq mi)
- Time zone: UTC+3 (AST)

Rusafa or Al-Rasafa (Arabic: ٱلرُّصَافَة \ رَّصَافَة, romanized: Ruṣāfah / Ar-Raṣāfah) is one of the nine administrative districts in Baghdad, Iraq, on the eastern side of the River Tigris (on the west side of which is Al-Karkh). It is one of the old quarters of Baghdad, situated in the heart of the city, The Rasafa side is one of the main parts of the city of Baghdad, the capital of Iraq. Along with Karkh, it forms the essential components of the city, with the Tigris River flowing between them. The Rasafa side is known for its numerous cultural and historical landmarks, including the Old City, the Republic Bridge, and various markets and residential areas. and is home to a number of public squares housing important monumental artworks.

== Description ==
This district is an older area on the eastern side of Baghdad; its central commercial area, a centre of markets considered one of the four old central business districts of Baghdad (Karkh, Rusafa, Adhamiyah and Kadhimiya). It includes many urban features which have become landmarks including Firdos Square and Liberation Square, the biggest landmark in Baghdad and one of the most visited. It has also been home to a number of monumental artworks including the Monument to the Unknown Soldier (1959–2002) designed by local architect, Rifat Chadirji; a statue of Saddam Hussein (2002–2003) by local sculptor Khalid Ezzat, which was replaced by Freedom by local sculptor Bassem Hamad al-Dawiri, all located in Firdos Square. The Freedom Monument (Nasb al-Hurriyah), a work by architect Rifat Chadirji and sculptor Jawad Saleem is Baghdad's most iconic work, and is situated in Liberation Square. The sculpture of Shahriyar and Scheherazade by sculptor Mohammed Ghani Hikmat, situated on the banks of the Tigris River near Abu Nuwas Street, is another example of Iraqi art featured in the area. Neighbourhoods of Rusafa district include Bab Al-Moatham and Al-Sa'adoon.

=== Mausoleum of Abdul-Qadir Gilani ===
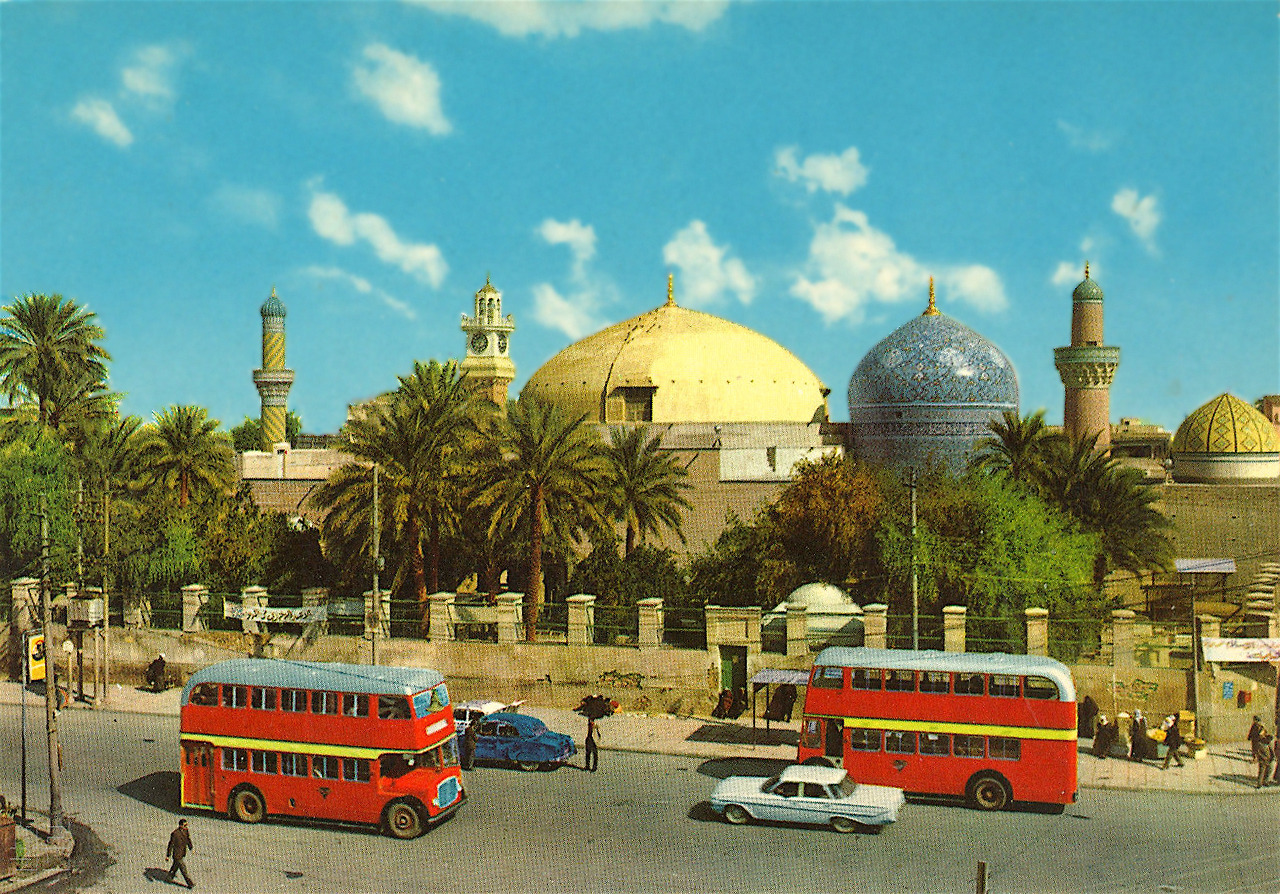
The mausoleum in the 1960s

Another prominent shrine in this district is that of the Hanbali Sufi saint, Abdul Qadir Gilani, who founded the Qadiriyya order. The complex consist of a mosque, mausoleum, and the library known as Qadiriyya Library, which contains various books for Islam.

=== Mausoluem of Imam Ahmad ibn Hanbal ===
The Arif Agha Mosque (Arabic: مسجد عارف آغا) contains the purported mausoleum (Arabic: ضريح الإمام أحمد بن حنبل) and grave of Ahmad ibn Hanbal, founder of the Hanbali school of thought. The present structure is a 1998 reconstruction of an earlier Ottoman-period structure. It is visited by pilgrims worldwide, similar to the aforementioned mausoleum of Abdul Qadir al-Jilani. Since 2003, the site has been under the management of the Sunni Endowment Office of Iraq.

=== Meir Taweig Synagogue ===
Meir Taweig Synagogue, also known as Meir Taweig Abraham Synagogue, is a large compound in Bataween, which consists of a synagogue, a Jewish school and a library. It is the only active synagogue in Baghdad, where remaining Jews manage.

== See also ==
- List of places in Iraq
- List of neighborhoods and districts in Baghdad
