= Firdos Square =

Prominent square in Baghdad, Iraq

Al-Firdos Square
- City square
- ساحة الفردوس
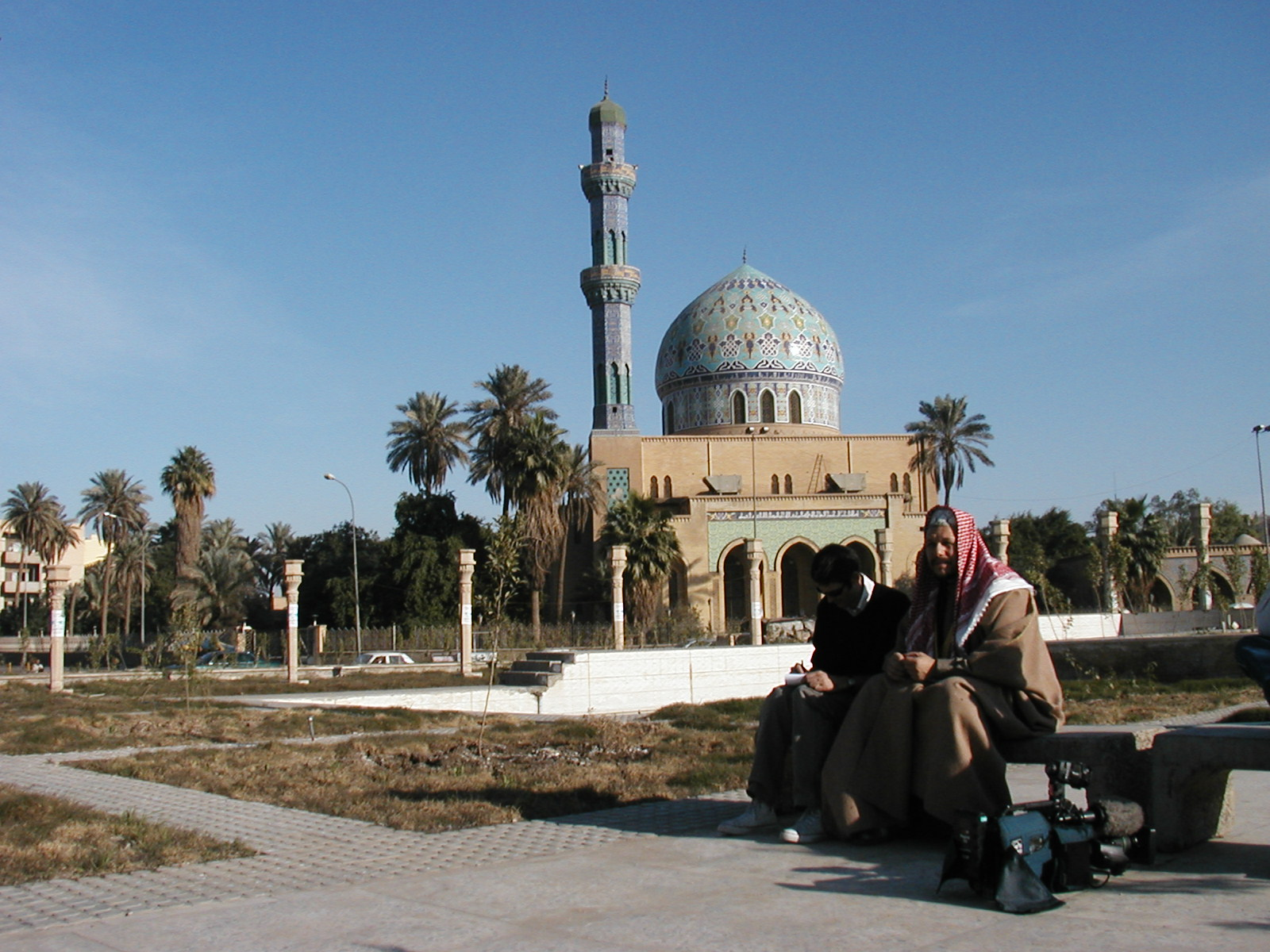
- Section of Firdos Square in foreground, with Ramadan Mosque behind in 2003
- Location: Al-Sadoon Street and Abu-Nuw'as Street, Al-Rusafa quarter Baghdad, Iraq
- Interactive map of Al-Firdos Square
- Coordinates: 33°18′52.68″N 44°25′14.43″E

Al-Firdos Square (Arabic: ساحة الفردوس, romanized: Sāḥat al-Firdaus) is a public open space in central Baghdad, Iraq. It is named after the Persian word Ferdows, meaning 'paradise'. The site has been the location of several monumental artworks.

Al-Firdos Square is located in the middle of al-Sa'doun Street and between Tahrir and Kahramana squares and in front of the 17th of Ramadan Mosque. The square is also located opposite the Abu Nawas Street which overlooks the Tigris River. Two of the best-known hotels in Baghdad, the Palestine Hotel and the Sheraton Ishtar, are located on the square.

The square is infamous for the toppling of the statue of Saddam Hussein during the US-led invasion of Iraq in 2003. The image of the toppling was shown across the world and became a symbol of victory in Iraq. At the same time, it became a symbol of American propaganda. The square is also the site of the killing of two journalists in the Palestine Hotel on the 8th of April.

== History ==
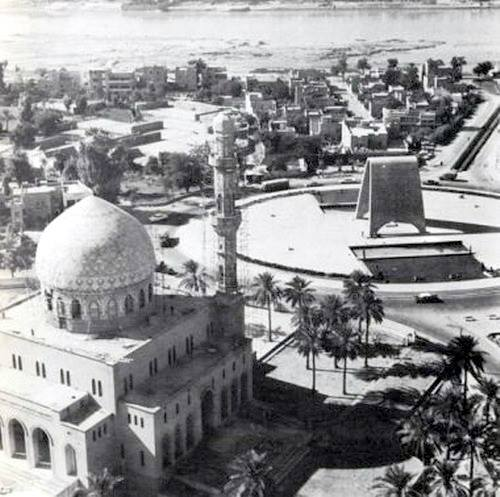
The Square during the Kingdom of Iraq in the 1950s

The roundabout in the center of al-Firdos Square has been the site of several monuments beginning with the completion of the monumental arch The Unknown Soldier in 1959. It was subsequently replaced by the statue of Saddam Hussein that was removed by U.S. coalition forces during the invasion of Iraq in 2003. A green, abstract sculpture by Bassem Hamad al-Dawiri was commissioned to replace the Saddam statue. In 2009, the architect of the Monument to the Unknown Soldier Rifat Chadirji expressed interest in rebuilding the monument on its original site. As of 2013, the al-Dawiri statue and the surrounding columns have been removed from al-Firdos Square.

=== Statue of Saddam Hussein ===
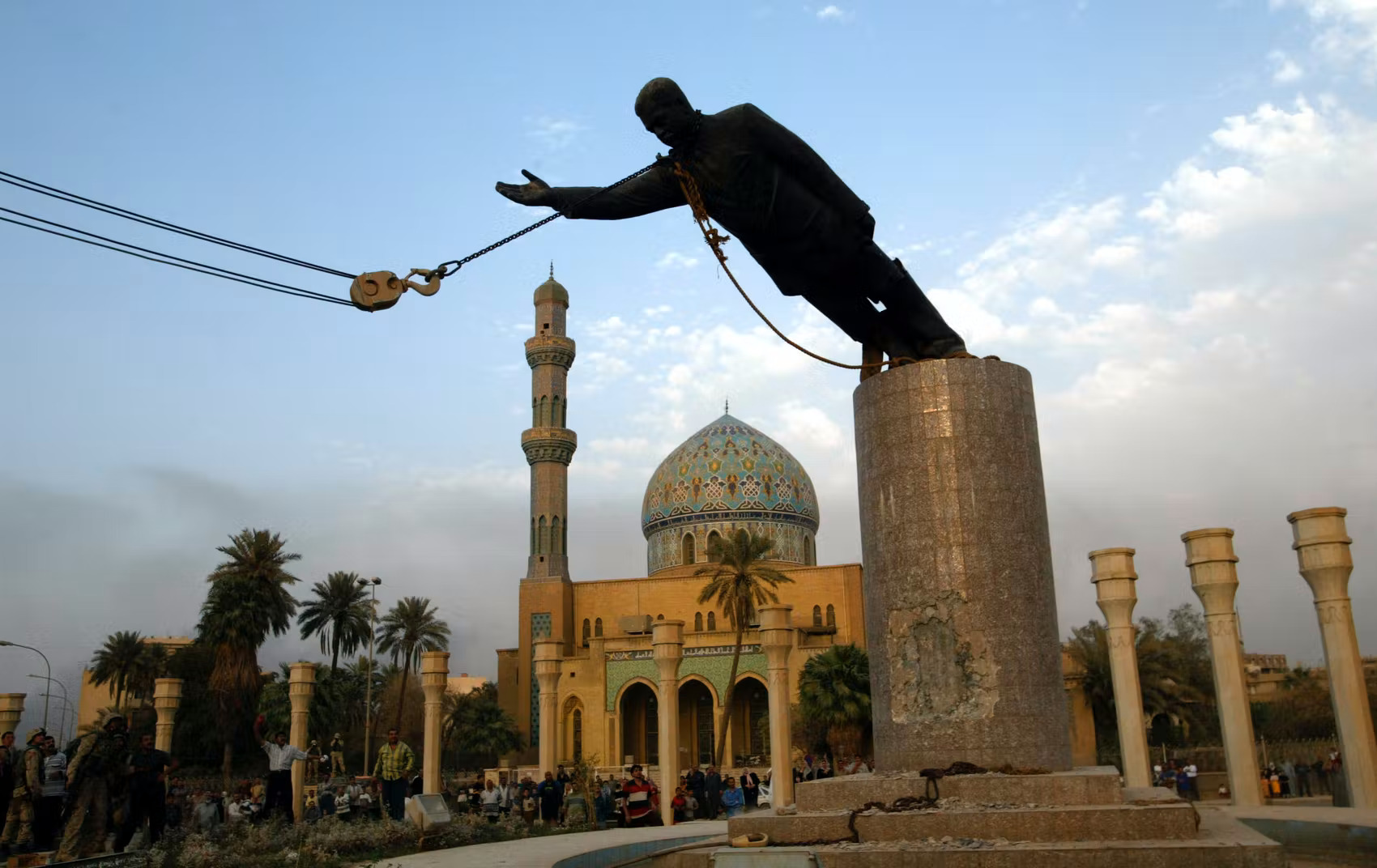
The infamous toppling of Saddam Hussein’s statue in Firdos Square in Baghdad shortly after the invasion of Iraq in 2003

In April 2002, a 12-metre (39 ft) statue, designed by Iraqi sculptor, Khalid Ezzat, was erected in honor of Saddam Hussein's 65th birthday.

In 2003, the statue was pulled down by Iraqi citizens, with the help of American forces during the invasion of Iraq in front of a crowd of around a hundred Iraqis. The event was widely televised, and some of this footage was criticized for exaggerating the size of the crowd. Robert Fisk described it as "the most staged photo opportunity since Iwo Jima".

=== Replacement statue ===
The site of statue now houses a green, abstract sculpture intended to symbolize freedom, designed by sculptor Bassem Hamad al-Dawiri and built by a group of artists calling themselves Najin (The Survivors). The replacement sculpture was constructed quickly and completed within months of its predecessor's removal.

Of necessity, the statue makes use of basic construction materials and methods. It is made of painted plaster, seven meters (23 feet) in height, and includes a symbolic Iraqi family holding aloft a crescent moon, which represents Islam, and the sun represents the ancient Sumerian civilization.

=== 2005 protest ===
On April 9, 2005, the second anniversary of the invasion of Iraq, the square was the center of a large-scale demonstration from tens of thousands of Iraqis protesting the American occupation. The demonstration was organized by Muqtada al-Sadr, a Shi'a cleric, and supported by Sheikh Abd al-Zahra al-Suwaid, a follower of the Green Party. Suwaid was quoted as stating to the gathered "The rally must be peaceful. You should demand the withdrawal of the occupation forces and press for quicker trials for Saddam Hussein and his aides before an Iraqi court."

=== Reconstruction of the square ===
The square remained an empty desert for years despite the large sums of money that entered the country. There were many attempts by the Municipality to rehabilitate the square until recently in 2020, the Iraqi private sector, through the Association of Iraqi Private Banks and in cooperation with the Central Bank, completely reconstructed the square and opened it to the public in hopes to leave behind its past and transform it into a cultural hub.

== See also ==
- Media coverage of the Iraq War
- Iraqi art
- Al-Habboubi Square
