= National Geographic Abu Dhabi =

Emirati television channel

National Geographic Abu Dhabi ناشيونال جيوغرافيك أبوظبي
- Country: United Arab Emirates
- Broadcast area: Arab World
- Headquarters: Abu Dhabi, United Arab Emirates

Programming
- Language(s): Arabic; English

Ownership
- Owner: National Geographic Society; Disney Middle East FZ LLC; Abu Dhabi Media Company; Government of Abu Dhabi
- Sister channels: National Geographic Kids Abu Dhabi; National Geographic; Nat Geo Wild; Drama

History
- Launched: 1 July 2009; 16 years ago

Links
- Website: natgeotv.com/ae

National Geographic Abu Dhabi (Arabic: ناشيونال جيوغرافيك أبوظبي) is a free-to-air documentary channel that started broadcasting on 1 July 2009. The channel is based in Abu Dhabi, United Arab Emirates. Owned by National Geographic Society/The Walt Disney Company EMEA (Disney Middle East FZ LLC) and the Abu Dhabi Media Foundation.

In 2010, a magazine was introduced.

== Programming ==
- The Emergence of a Union (2016)
- Mars
- Wicked Tuna (2012)
