= Bassem Hamad al-Dawiri =

- Born: 1973
- Died: 19 September 2007 (Age 34); Kut, Iraq
- Education: Baghdad College of Arts
- Known for: Painter and sculptor

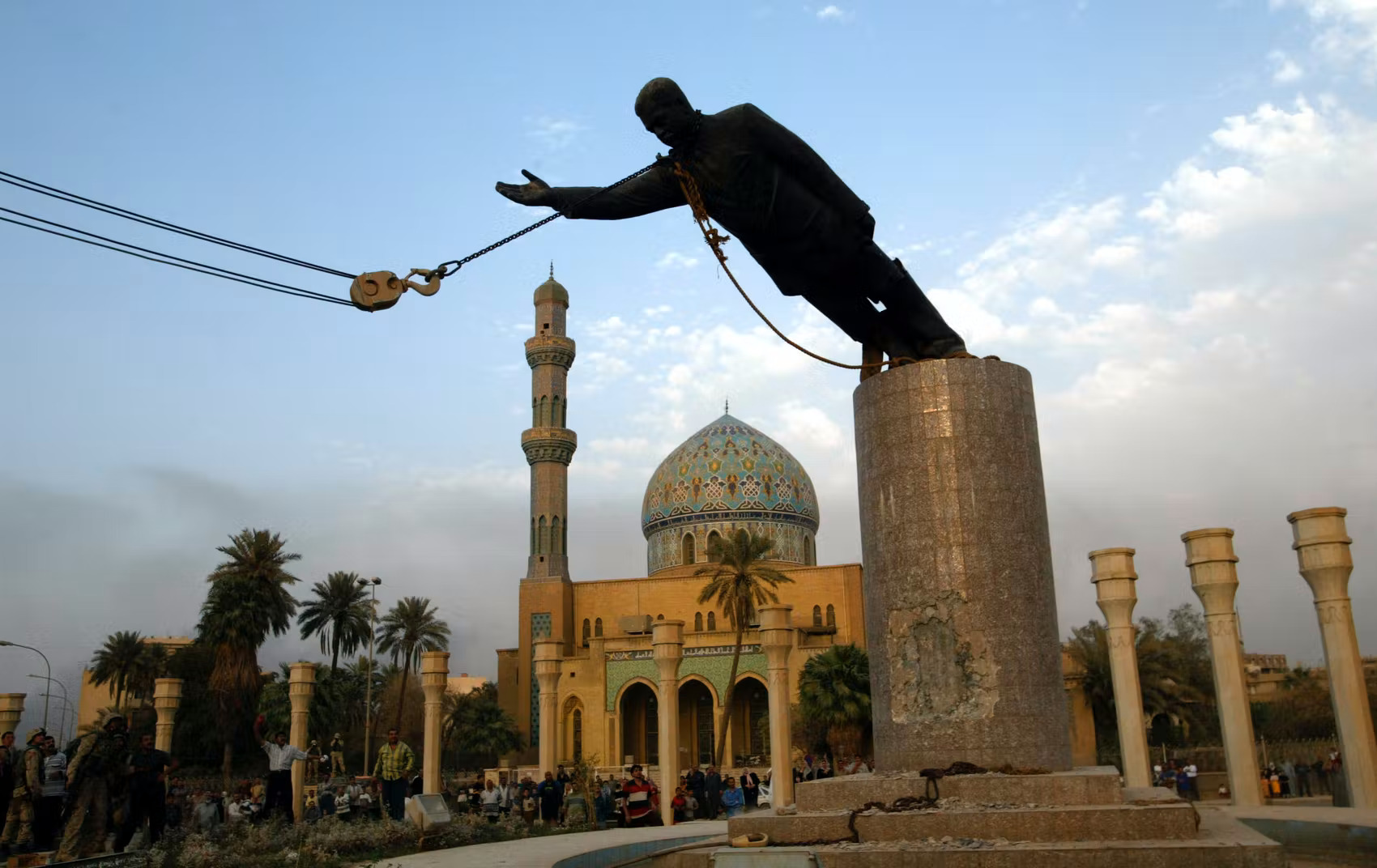
Statue of Saddam Hussein being toppled in Baghdad’s Firdos Square

Bassem Hamad al-Dawiri (died 19 September 2007) was an Iraqi sculptor and artist. He helped create a Baghdad artist association, called the "Survivors' Group" following the fall of the Saddam Hussein government in 2003.

== Life and career ==
Al-Dawiri was born in Iraq. He was a 1993 graduate of Baghdad College of Fine Arts.

Bassem Hamad al-Dawiri co-founded an artist association, called the "Survivors' Group," following the ouster of Saddam Hussein during the 2003 invasion of Iraq. The group has erected a number of statues throughout Baghdad, despite the violence.

Al-Dawiri's most famous work came after the overthrow of Saddam Hussein. On 9 April 2003, crowds of Iraqis, aided by United States Marines, toppled a massive statue of Saddam Hussein in Firdos Square, located in the heart of Baghdad. Pictures of the destruction of the statue, which depicted Saddam in a suit with his right arm outstretched, were aired on news broadcasts worldwide. Iraqis were jubilantly seen hitting the statue with their shoes and throwing garbage at Saddam's likeness.

Bassem Hamad al-Dawiri was asked by Iraq's interim authorities to erect a new sculpture in Firdos Square less than one month after the destruction of the Saddam statue. Al-Dawiri and a group of artists whom he asked to work with him on the project, created a new modernist sculpture on the site of the old Saddam statue. Al-Dawiri's new sculpture depicts branches reaching towards the Iraqi sky with a ball balancing on a crescent moon. The sculpture is meant to symbolize the unity of Iraq's three main groups – Shias, Sunnis and Kurds. Critics have charged that the sculpture is meaningless considering the sectarian violence which has engulfed Baghdad and Iraq since 2003.

Al-Dawari also created a memorial statue dedicated to 18 Iraqi children killed in a suicide car blast in 2005. The statue, which was located in a poor Shia neighborhood called New Baghdad in the eastern part of the city, was destroyed by explosives only months after its creation.

== Death ==
Bassem Hamad al-Dawiri was killed in a car accident in the southern Iraqi city of Kut on 19 September 2007. Kut is located approximately 100 miles from Baghdad. Al-Dawiri was driving to visit relatives when one of his tires blew out causing his car to overturn. He was 34 years old and was survived by his wife, who was expecting the couple's first child. His death was reported by the Association of Iraqi Artists, of which he was a member.

== See also ==
- Iraqi art
- Islamic art
- List of Iraqi artists
