= List of hotels: Countries I =

This is a list of what are intended to be the notable top hotels by country, five or four star hotels, notable skyscraper landmarks or historic hotels which are covered in multiple reliable publications.

== Iceland ==
- Hótel Búðir, Snaefellsnes peninsula
- Iceland Parliament Hotel, Reykjavik

== Indonesia ==
Jakarta

- Hotel Indonesia Kempinski, Central Jakarta
- JW Marriott Jakarta, South Jakarta
- Ritz Carlton Jakarta

Medan

- Inna Dharma Deli Hotel

Surabaya

- Hotel Majapahit
- JW Marriot Surabaya

== Iran ==
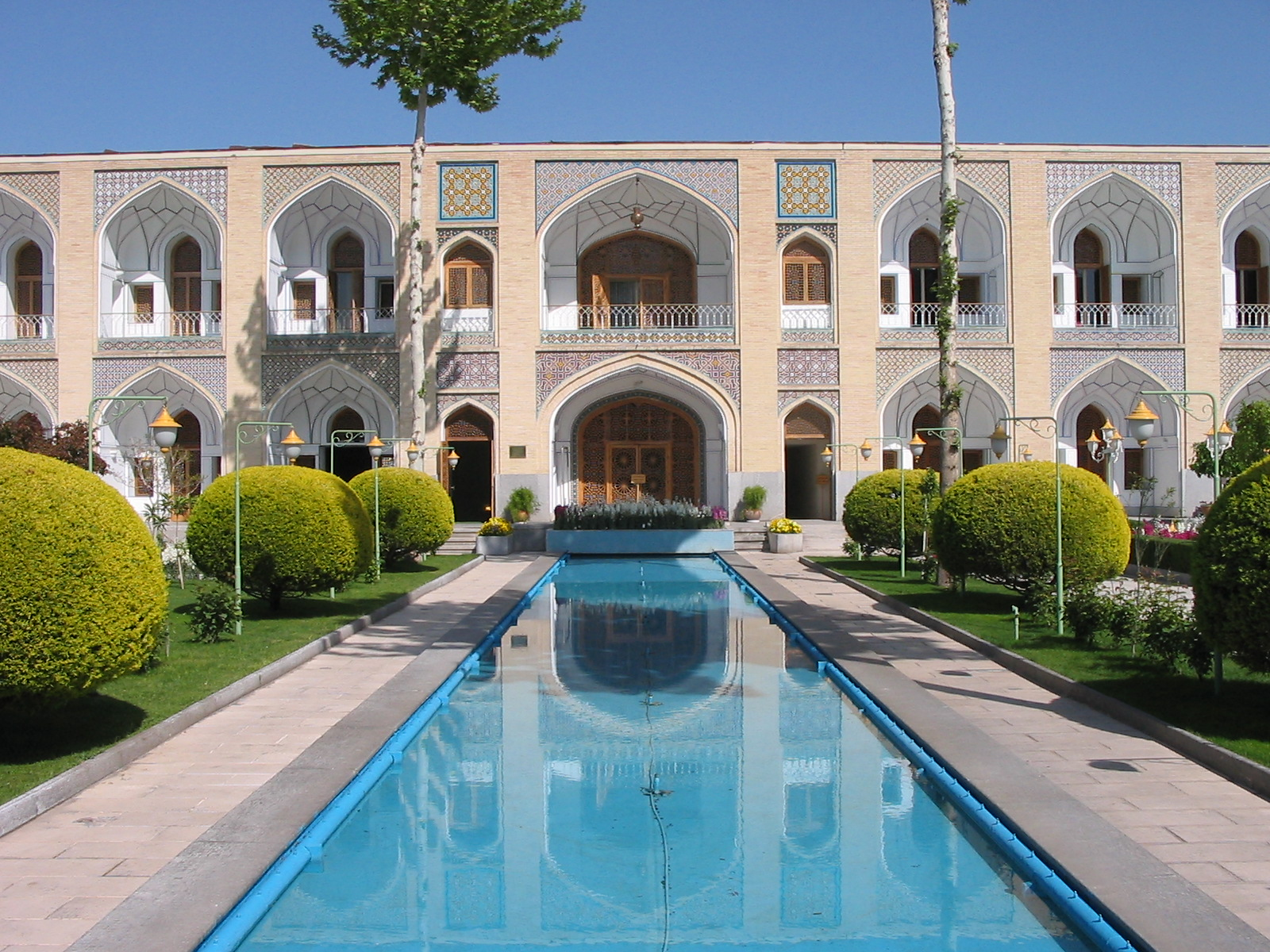
Abbasi Hotel

- Abbasi Hotel, Isfahan
- Dariush Grand Hotel, Kish Island
- Parsian Azadi Hotel, Tehran

== Iraq ==
- Al-Fanar Hotel, Baghdad
- Al Rasheed Hotel, Baghdad
- Babel Hotel, Baghdad
- Baghdad Hotel, Baghdad
- Basrah Sheraton, Basra
- Erbil International Hotel, Arbil
- Ishtar Sheraton Hotel, Baghdad
- Khanzad Hotel, Arbil
- Mansour Hotel, Baghdad
- Palestine Hotel, Baghdad
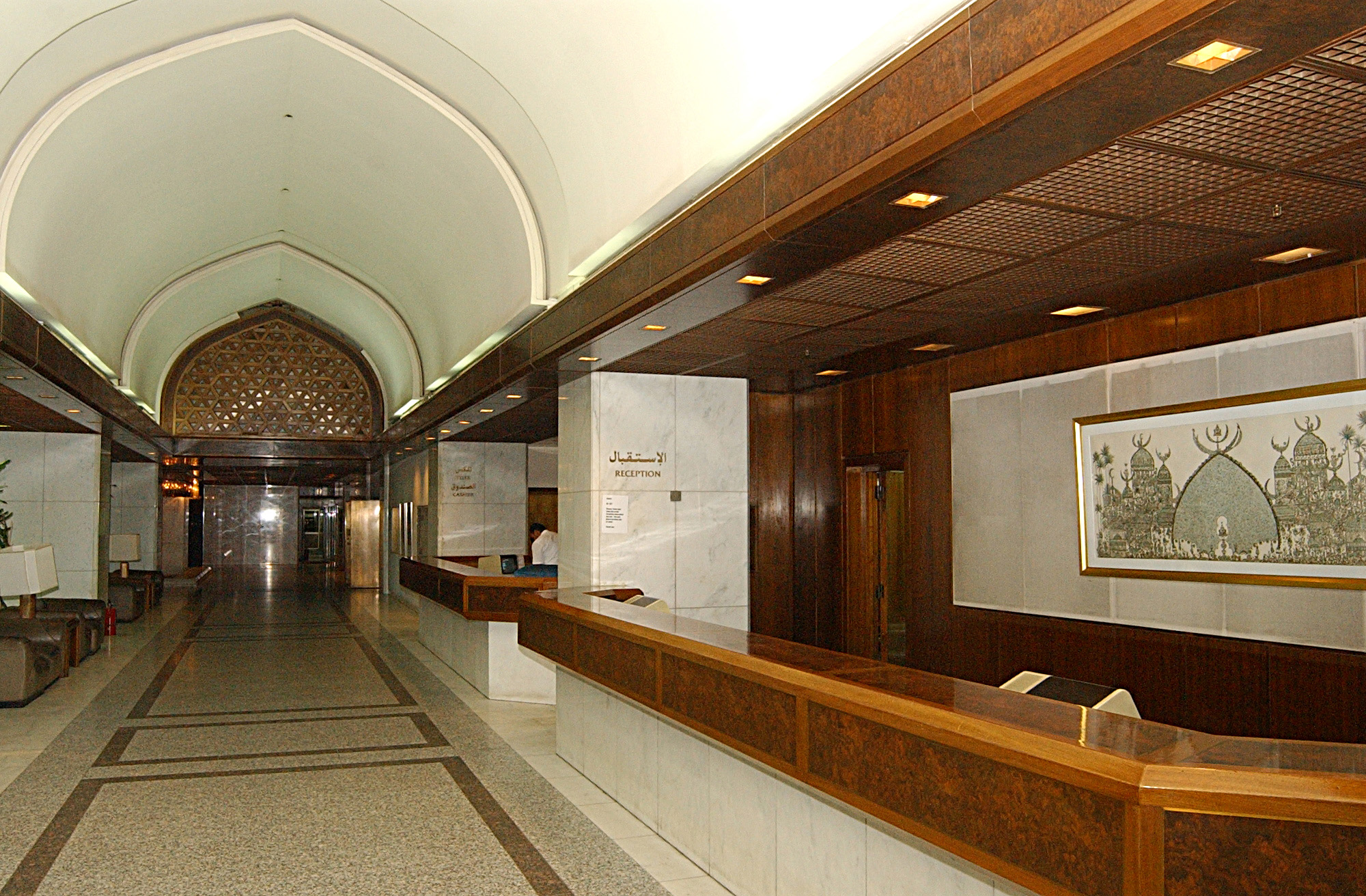
Al Rasheed Hotel

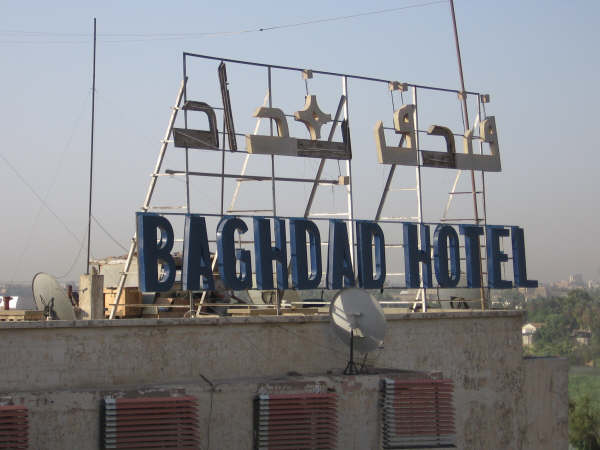
Baghdad Hotel

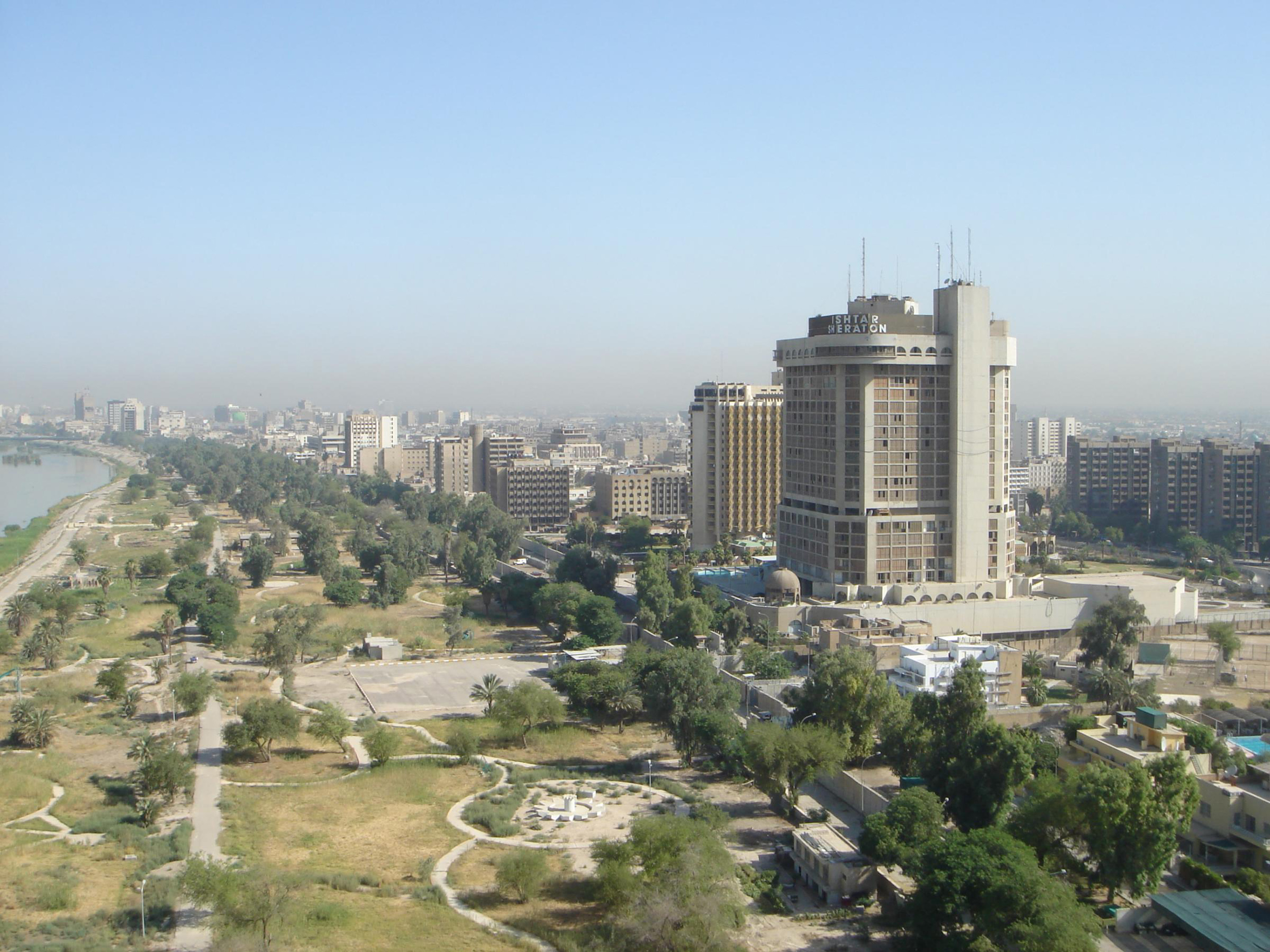
Ishtar Sheraton Hotel

== Israel ==
- American Colony Hotel, Jerusalem
- David Citadel Hotel, Jerusalem
- Inbal Jerusalem Hotel, Jerusalem
- Isrotel Tower, Tel Aviv
- Jerusalem Gate Hotel, Jerusalem
- King David Hotel, Jerusalem
- Leonardo City Tower Hotel, Ramat Gan
- Leonardo Plaza Hotel Jerusalem, Jerusalem
- Mount of Olives Hotel, Jerusalem
- Seven Arches Hotel, Jerusalem
- The Shepherd Hotel, Jerusalem
- Vered Hagalil, Sea of Galilee
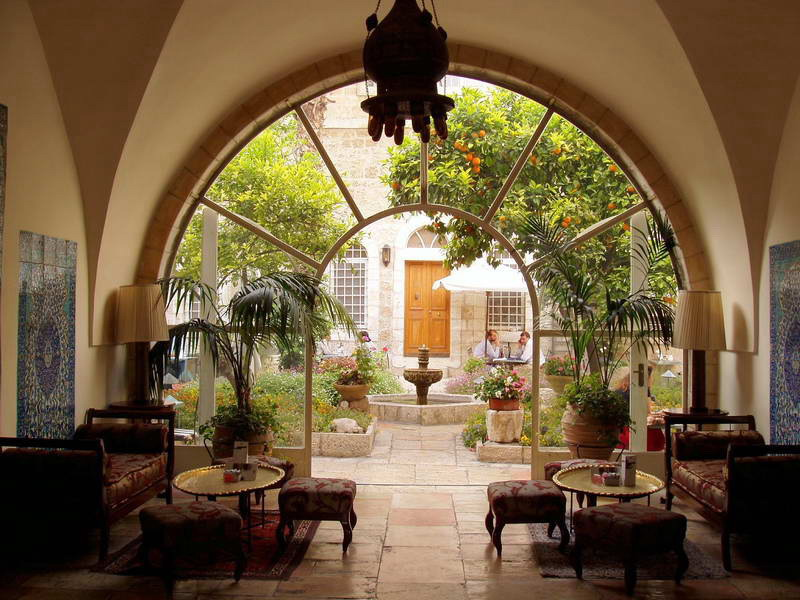
American Colony Hotel

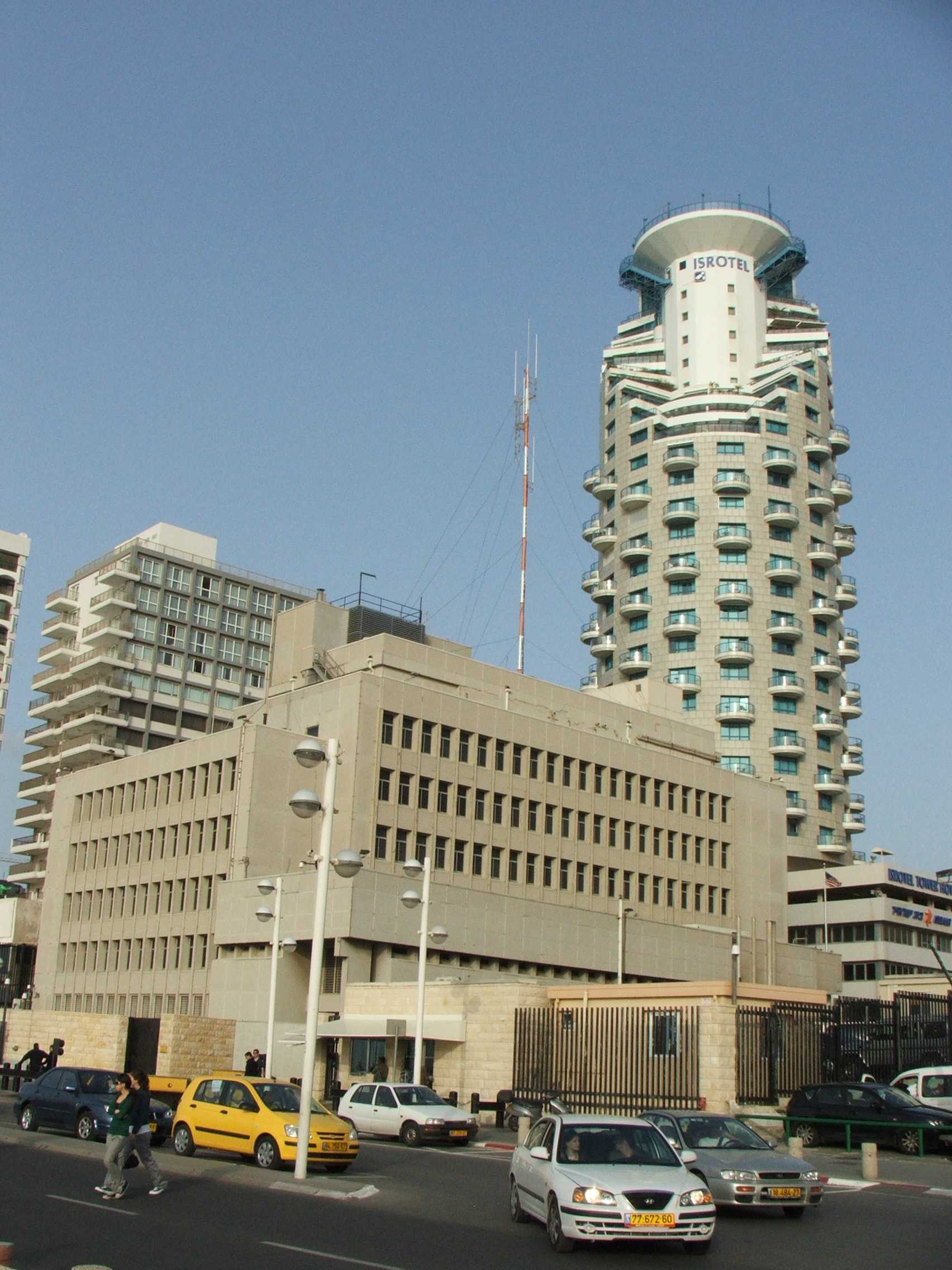
Isrotel Tower

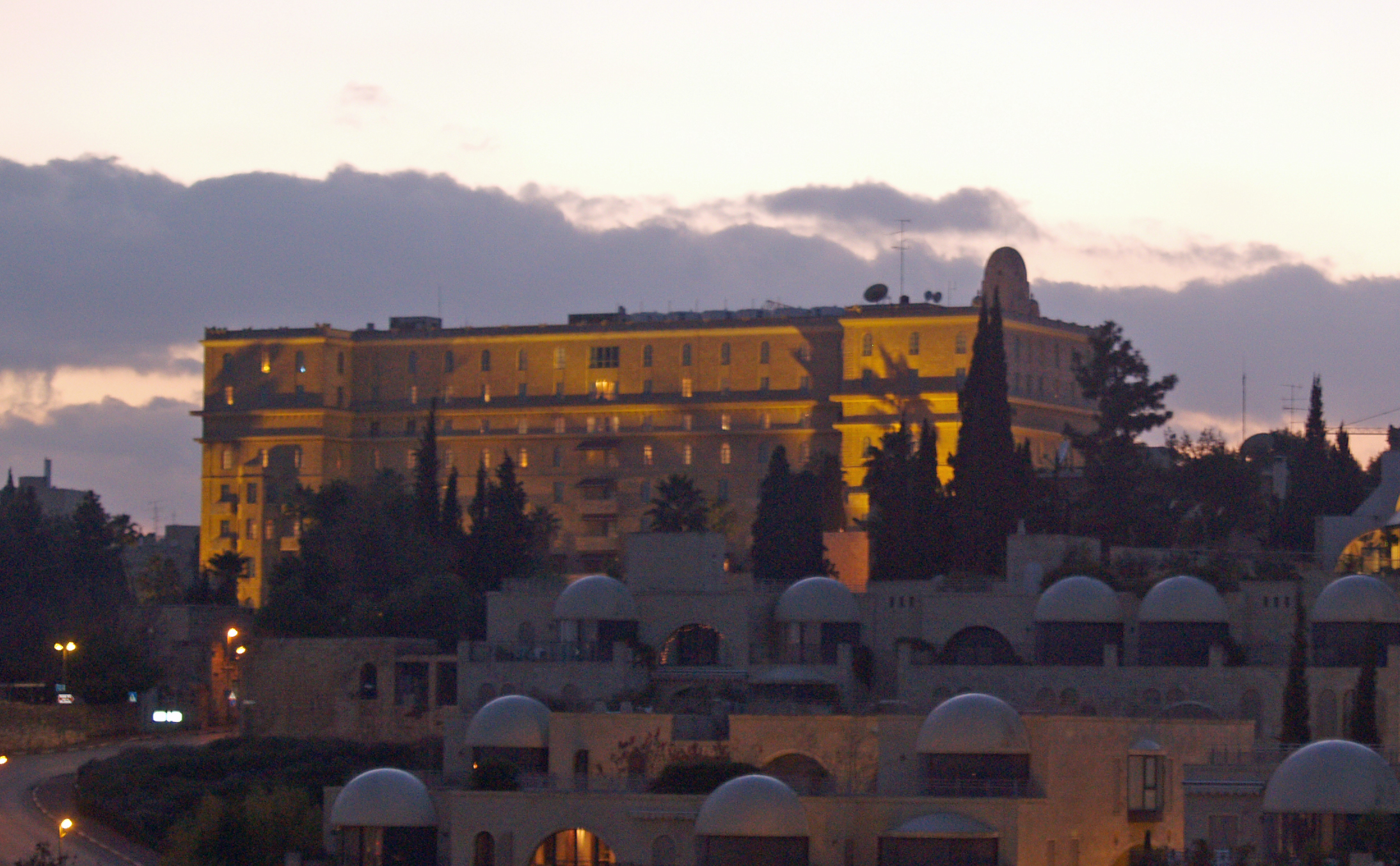
King David Hotel

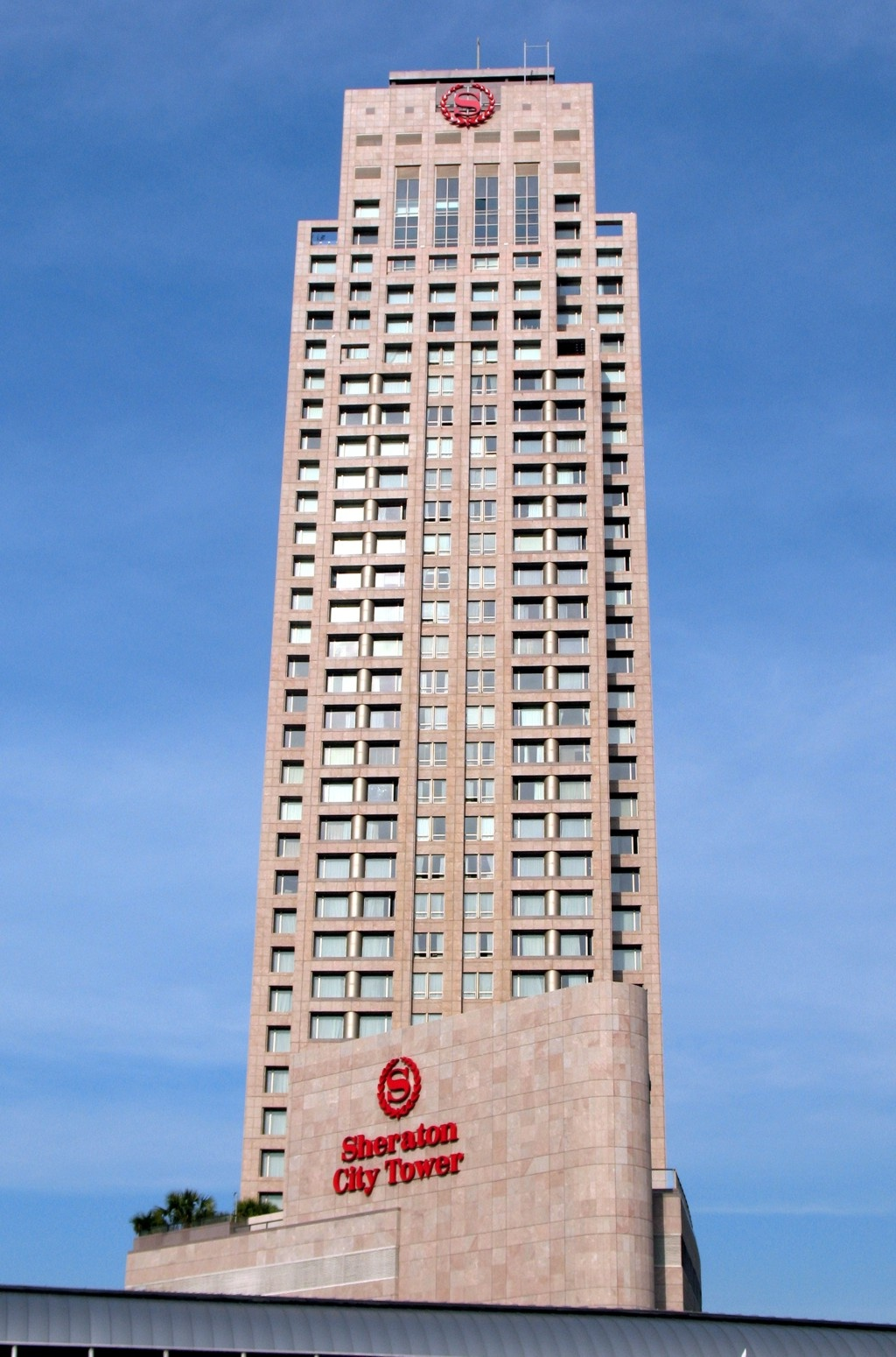
Leonardo City Tower Hotel

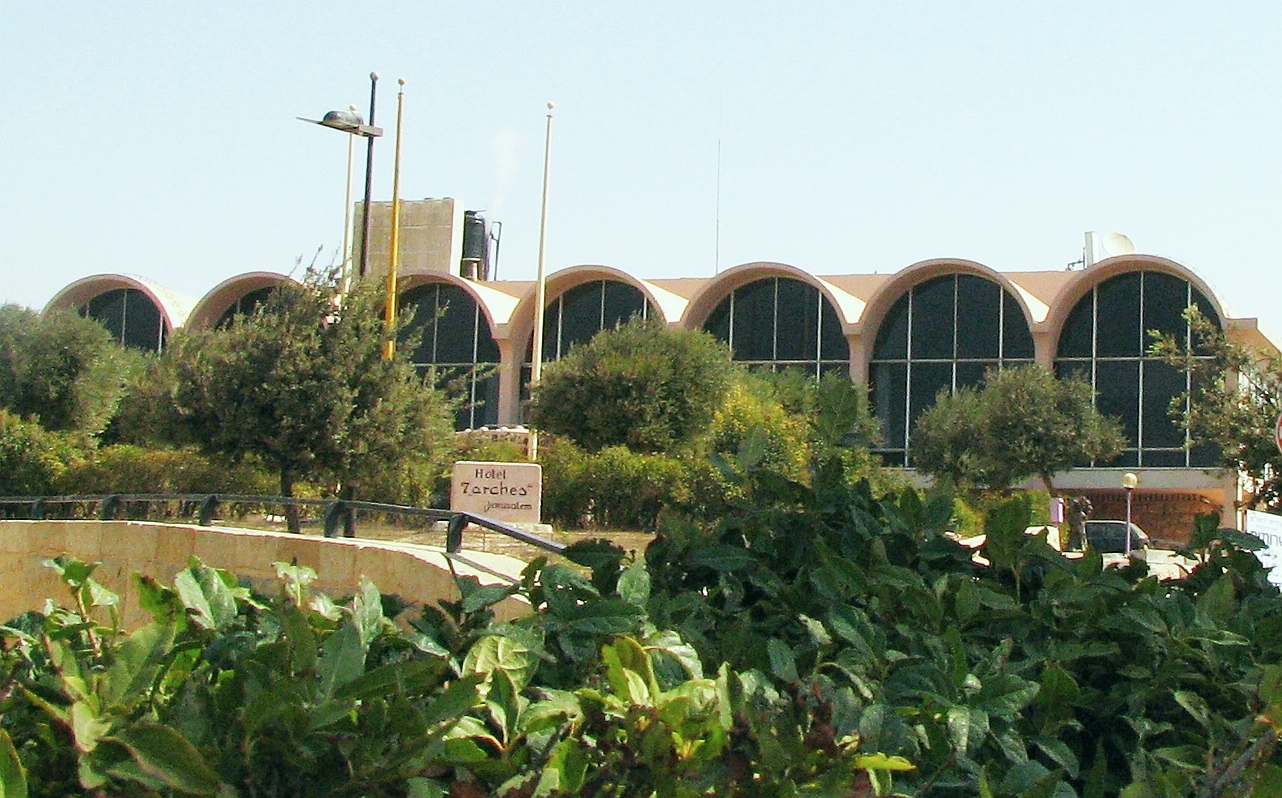
Seven Arches Hotel

== Italy ==
- Grand Hotel des Bains, Venice
- Grand Hotel Quisisana, Capri
- Grand Hotel Riccione, Riccione
- Grand Hotel Rimini, Rimini
- Hotel Caruso, Ravello
- Hotel Cipriani, Venice
- Hotel Danieli, Venice
- Hotel Florida Milan, Milan
- Hotel Splendido, Portofino
- Hotel Terme Millepini
- JK Place Capri, Capri
- Palazzo Dandolo, Venice
- Rosa Grand, Milan
- Royal Victoria Hotel, Pisa
- Savoia Excelsior Palace, Trieste
- Splendid Venice, Venice
- Starhotels Anderson, Milan
- Torre di Moravola, Umbria
- Town House Galleria, Milan
- Villa d'Este, Cernobbio, Lake Como
- Villa San Michele Hotel, Florence

=== Sicily ===
- Kempinski Hotel Giardino di Costanza, near Mazara del Vallo
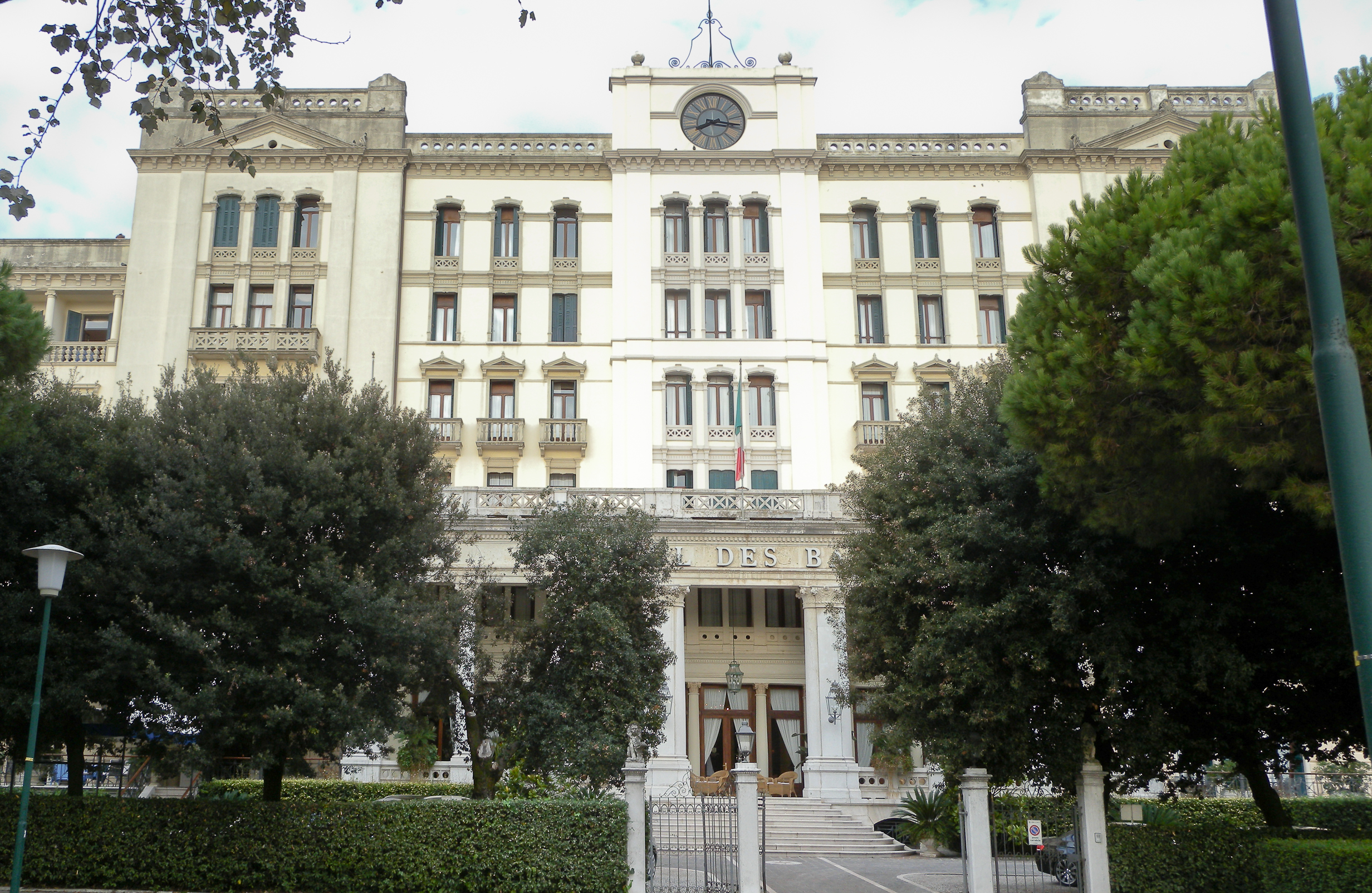
Grand Hotel des Bains

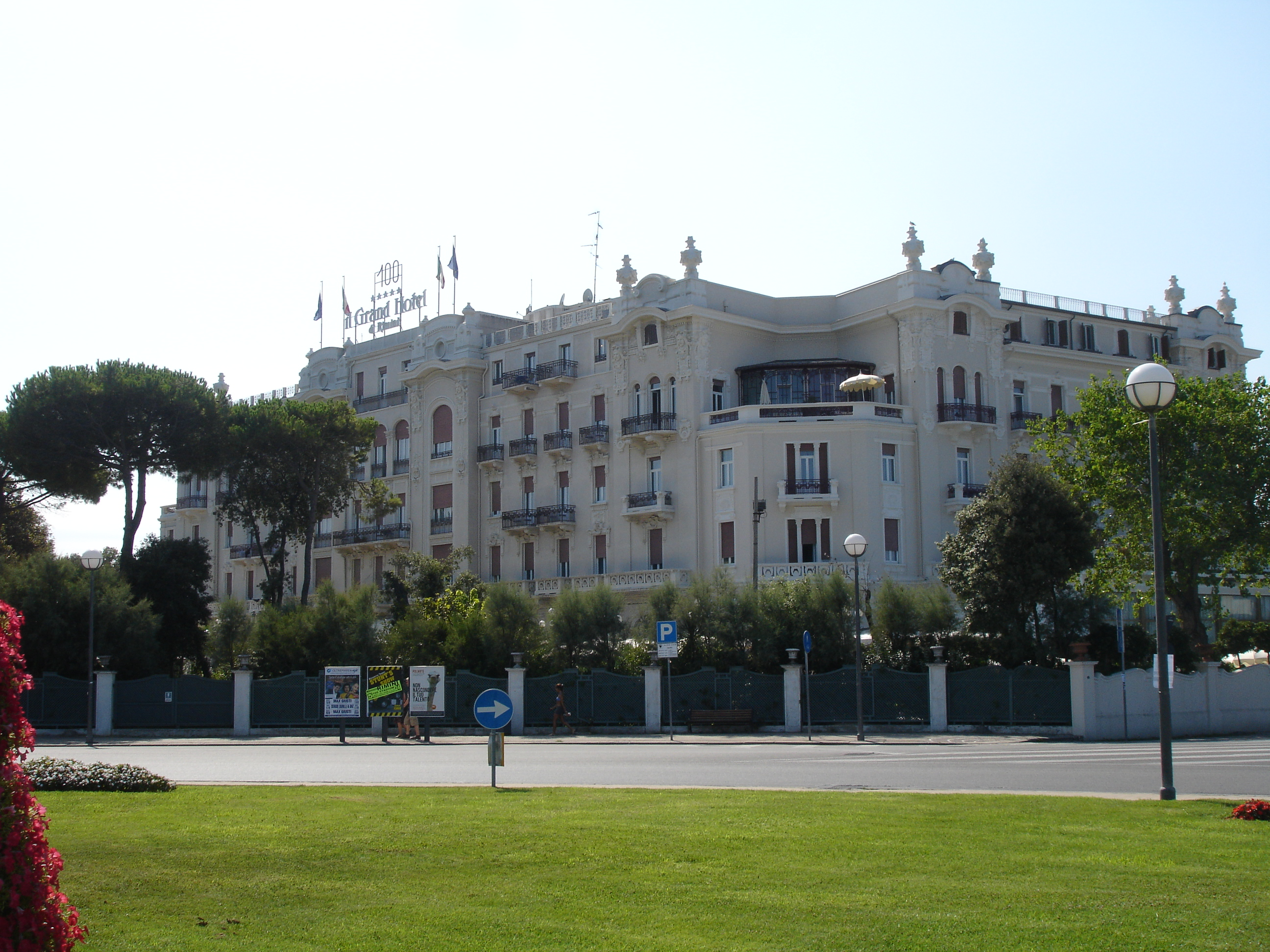
Rimini

Savoia Excelsior Palace

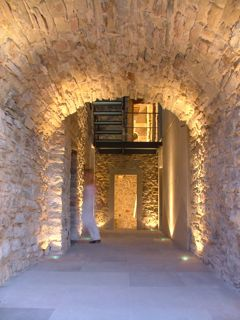
Torre di Moravola

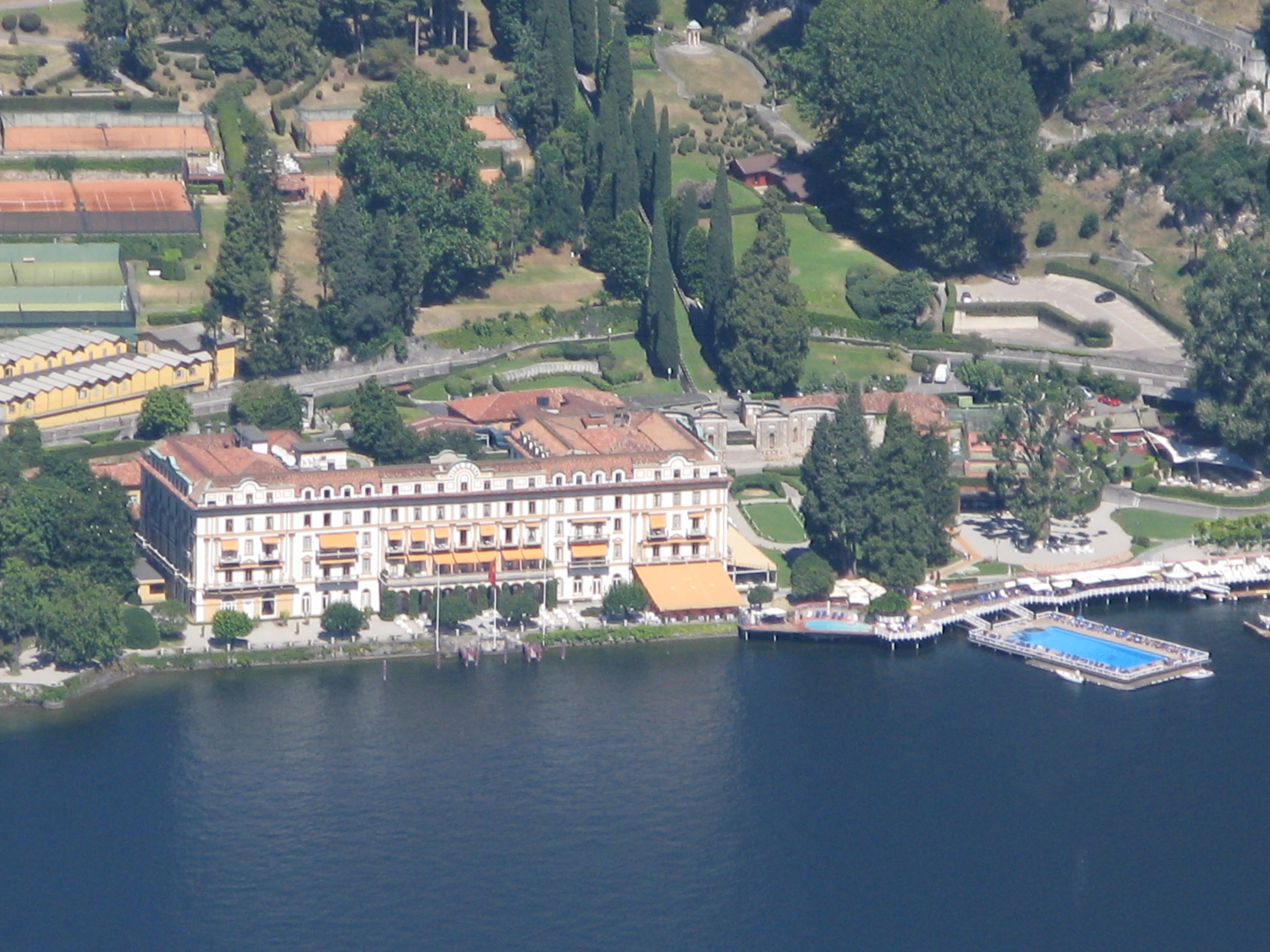
Villa d'Este, Cernobbio
