= Al-Mansour Hotel =

Hotel in Baghdad, Iraq

- Al-Mansour Hotel, located in the center of Baghdad
- Interactive map of the Al-Mansour Hotel area

General information
- Architectural style: Modern
- Location: Baghdad, Iraq
- Coordinates: 33.3279°N 44.3963°E
- Year built: 1970s
- Completed: 1980
- Opened: 1980

Technical details
- Floor count: 17

Design and construction
- Architecture firm: Meliá Hotels International

Al-Mansour Hotel (Arabic: فندق المنصور) is located on the bank of the Tigris River in the center of Baghdad. It was built in 1980 as the Al-Mansour Melia Hotel, part of the Spanish Meliá hotel chain. Under the regime of Saddam Hussein, the hotel became one of the finest in Baghdad, hosting visiting oil executives and businessmen. In 2007, the hotel was targeted in a bombing attack, resulting in 12 deaths.

== History ==
The hotel's building was completed in the 1970s and was opened during the Iran-Iraq War, the management of the hotel was granted in its infancy to the Spanish company Meliá Hotels International, and because of that it was known as "Al-Mansur Melia", and it was one of the first major hotels in the Iraqi capital. Despite the war and the fact that it was bombed three times by Iranian forces, it did not stop the hotel from its activities and events. Iraqis would choose this hotel to hold weddings and festivals that included poetry, Arab plastic art, theater, and solidarity conferences. These activities were supported by Saddam Hussein's government. During the Gulf War, the hotel suffered severe missile bombings after US forces made sure no journalist was in the building. After the events of 2003, the hotel suffered bombings, looting, burnings and mob attacks.

=== June 25th, 2007 incident ===
On Monday of June 25, 2007, a suicide bomber ran into the lobby of the hotel and ignited a bomb he was wearing and killed 12 civilians, including six sheikhs, four of whom were Sunni Muslims and two were Shi'a Muslims, who were discussing how to reconcile sectarian conflicts in the country and how to fight al-Qaeda in Iraq while drinking tea. Among the dead was a former governor of al-Anbar Governorate. 18 people were also wounded. At the time, the hotel housed the Chinese Embassy, several Western organizations and some members of the Iraqi Parliament. Witnesses reported that the suicide bomber must've passed between two checkpoints before reaching the hotel. The attack also showed that terrorists could also pass areas no matter how guarded or fortified they were. A survivor of the attack blamed people close to the new Iraqi government for the attack.

== See also ==
- Baghdad Hotel
- Ishtar Hotel
- Al-Rasheed Hotel
- Palestine Hotel
