= Hotel Florida =

Hotel Florida may refer to:

- Hotel Florida (Havana)
- Hotel Florida (Lerici)
- Hotel Florida (Madrid)
- Hotel Florida Milan
- Hotel Florida (Venice)
