= Ishtar Hotel =

Hotel in Baghdad, Iraq

- Ishtar Hotel in Baghdad
- Interactive map of the Ishtar Hotel area

General information
- Architectural style: Modern
- Location: Firdos Square, Baghdad, Iraq
- Coordinates: 33.3138°N 44.4189°E
- Year built: 1982
- Opened: 1982
- Renovated: 2011
- Owner: Iraqi government

Height
- Height: 99 meters

Technical details
- Material: Concrete

The Ishtar Hotel (Arabic: فندق عشتار), formerly known as the Ishtar Sheraton Hotel & Casino (فندق شيراتون عشتار) is a luxury hotel in Baghdad, Iraq. It is located on Firdos Square in Karrada District, the main financial center of the city. At 99 meters (325 ft) tall, it is the third tallest building in Baghdad and the fourth tallest structure in Iraq after the Baghdad Tower.

== History ==
=== Establishment ===
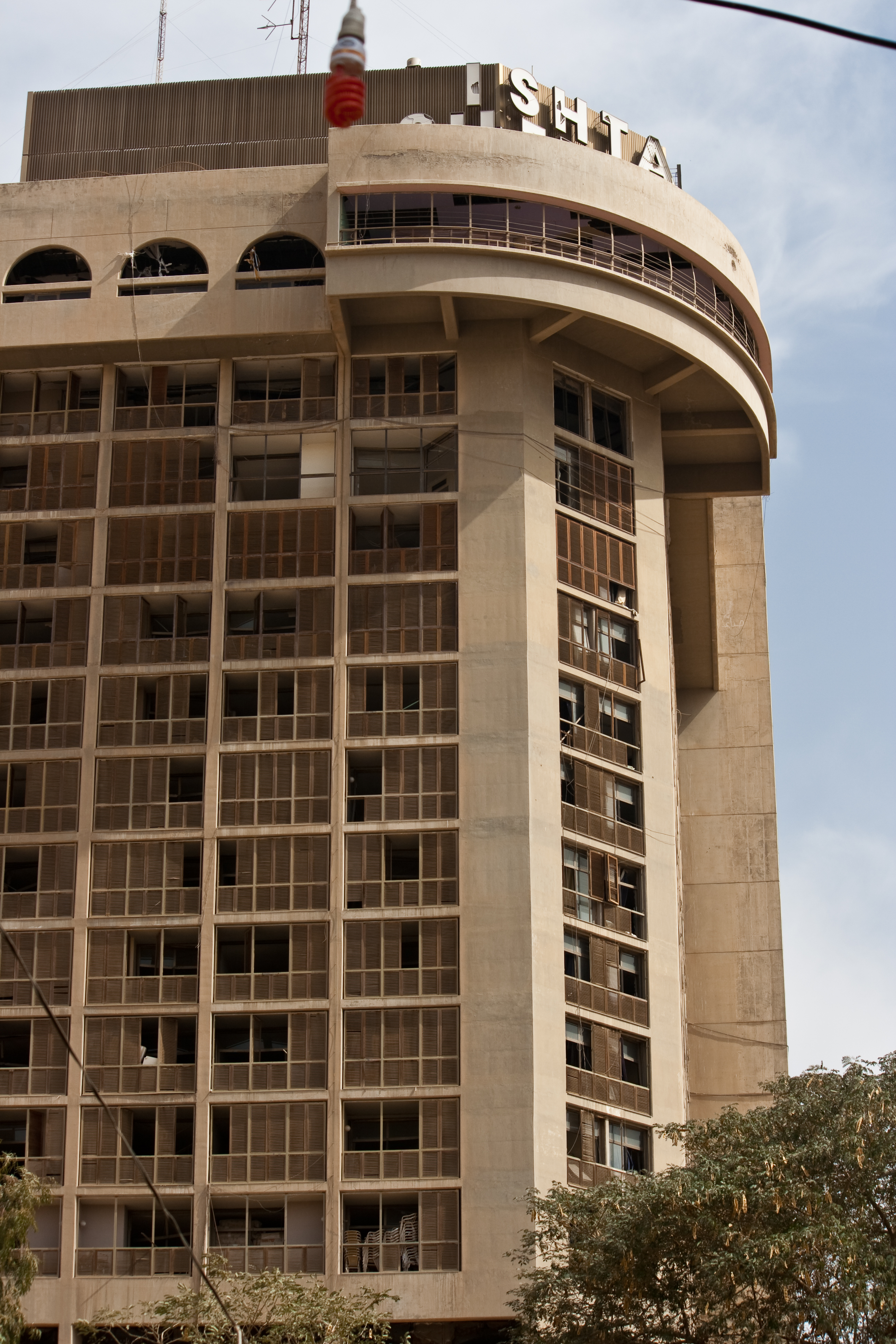
Ishtar Hotel viewed from Abu Nawas Street, 2000

Named after the ancient goddess Ishtar, the hotel opened in 1982 and was one of the most popular western-run hotels in Baghdad. It was designed by The Architects Collaborative (TAC), an American architectural firm founded in 1945 in Massachusetts by Walter Gropius and seven other young architects. Tuck began its career specializing in school buildings, completing a number of successful projects and being highly respected for its wide range of designs. It is considered one of the most prominent post-World War II modernist firms. Among the firm's designs are the Harvard University Center (1949-1950), the U.S. Embassy in Athens, the Arts and Communications Center, and the Evans Science Building at Phillips Academy in Andover, Massachusetts, both in 1959. It also designed the University of Baghdad in 1957.

When Iraq invaded Kuwait in 1990 and sanctions were imposed on Iraq, Sheraton Hotels severed their managed contract with the Iraqi government, which built and owned the property. The hotel continued to use the Sheraton name without permission for the following 22 years. During the Gulf War in 1991, the hotel attracted journalists and correspondents from international newspapers and agencies, such as BBC and CNN. From the hotel, news agencies broadcast live events in the war and the expulsion of the Iraqi Army from Kuwait.

=== 21st century ===
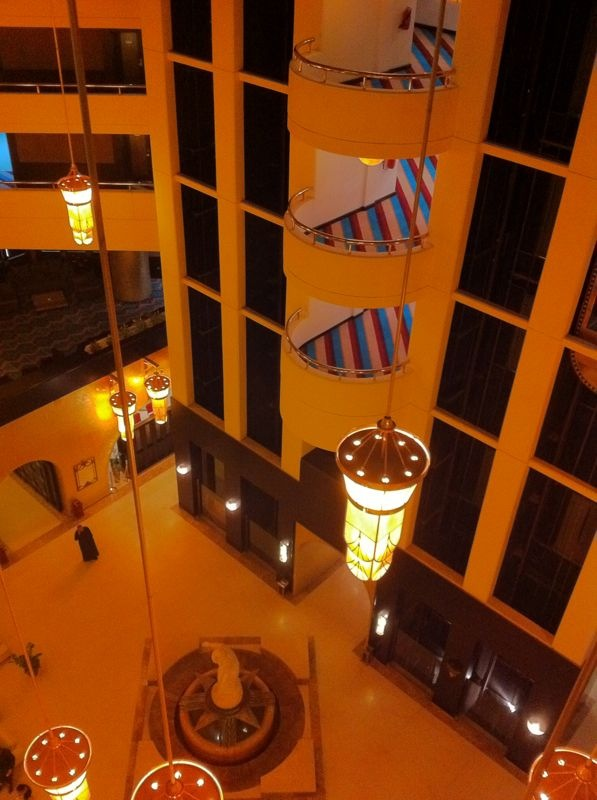
Inside the hotel

While the hotel was briefly popular with foreign journalists and contractors after the 2003 invasion of Iraq, its occupancy level soon dropped sharply. Correspondents' cameras broadcast live the bombing of Baghdad on March 19, 2003, and the ensuing battles. They also broadcast the fall of the statue of Saddam Hussein, located in Firdos Square opposite the hotel.

The hotel, an obvious and imposing target, was periodically hit with mortar or rocket fire during the early years of the post-Saddam era. The structure was seriously damaged during a bomb attack in October 2005 and was closed for more than a year afterward. Thirty-seven were killed in a car bomb attack outside of the hotel on January 25, 2010.

This hotel was renovated in 2011, along with five other of the biggest hotels in Baghdad, in preparation for the 2012 Arab League summit. The renovations were done by a Turkish company. During the Arab League summit, officials from various countries stayed at the hotel, along with journalists. The hotel was renamed Cristal Grand Ishtar Hotel in March 2013. The hotel is currently closed, although there have been plans to reopen it as part of the Turkish-based River Rock Hotels & Resorts chain.

== Features ==
The hotel was built on a small, triangular site between Abu Nuwas and Al-Saadoun Streets. The 20-story hotel consists of two blocks: the first is a tall, L-shaped tower overlooking the Tigris River, while the second block comprises a large internal courtyard that serves as the hotel entrance. The hotel's facade uses wooden lattices similar to those used in the Sheraton Basra Hotel, designed by the same consultant. These lattices were placed on the balconies of the rooms to reduce glare and heat from the sun's rays.

The lobby features a marble statue of Ishtar, standing on a fountain in the shape of the Star of Ishtar and the Star of Shamash. The hotel has 310 rooms, in addition to more than 50 small and private suites and presidential suites. It also has special halls for holding conferences and meetings, a swimming pool, a cafeteria, steam baths and salons. The hotel boasts an architectural style that blends modernity and history.

The hotel is named after an ancient Mesopotamian goddesses Ishtar, also known as Inanna. In the front courtyard of the Ishtar Hotel, in the middle of the corner leading to the elevators, stands a statue of the goddess Ishtar, extending her hand coquettishly to welcome her guests arriving from all over the world. There are various stories packed with related to the hotel and the goddesses.

== Gallery ==
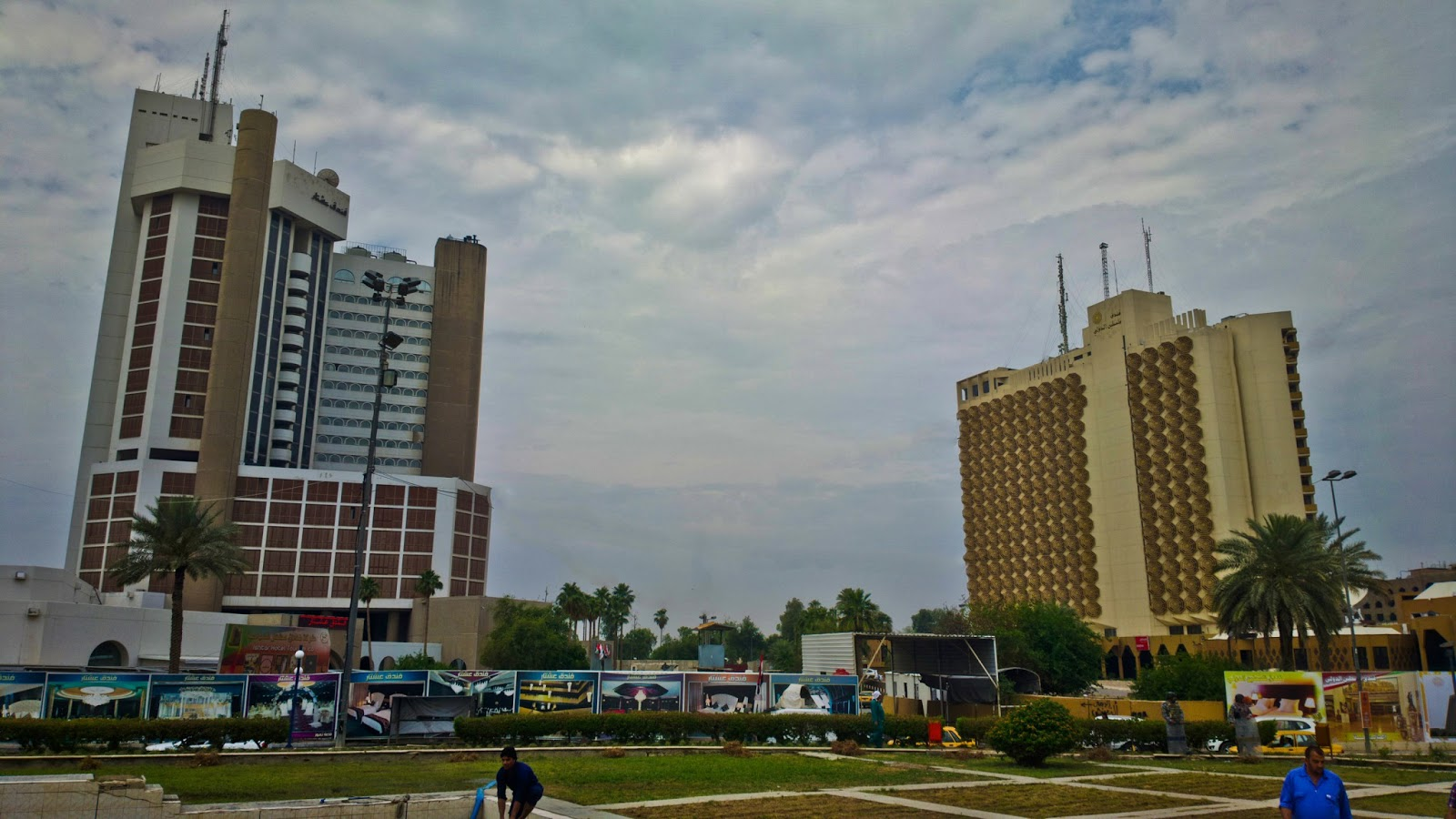
Ishtar Hotel on left, Palestine Hotel on right

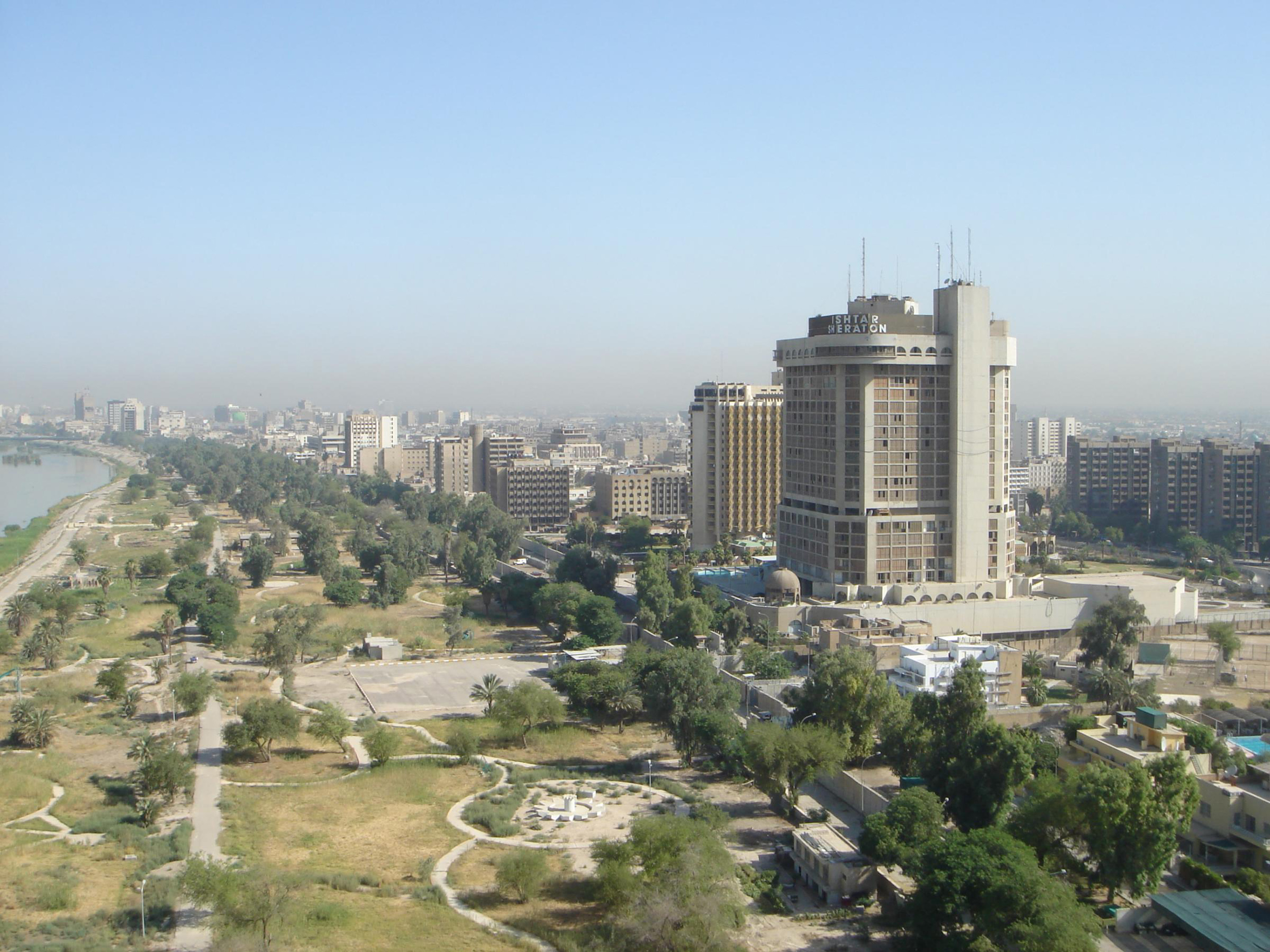
A view over the Ishtar and Palestine Hotel

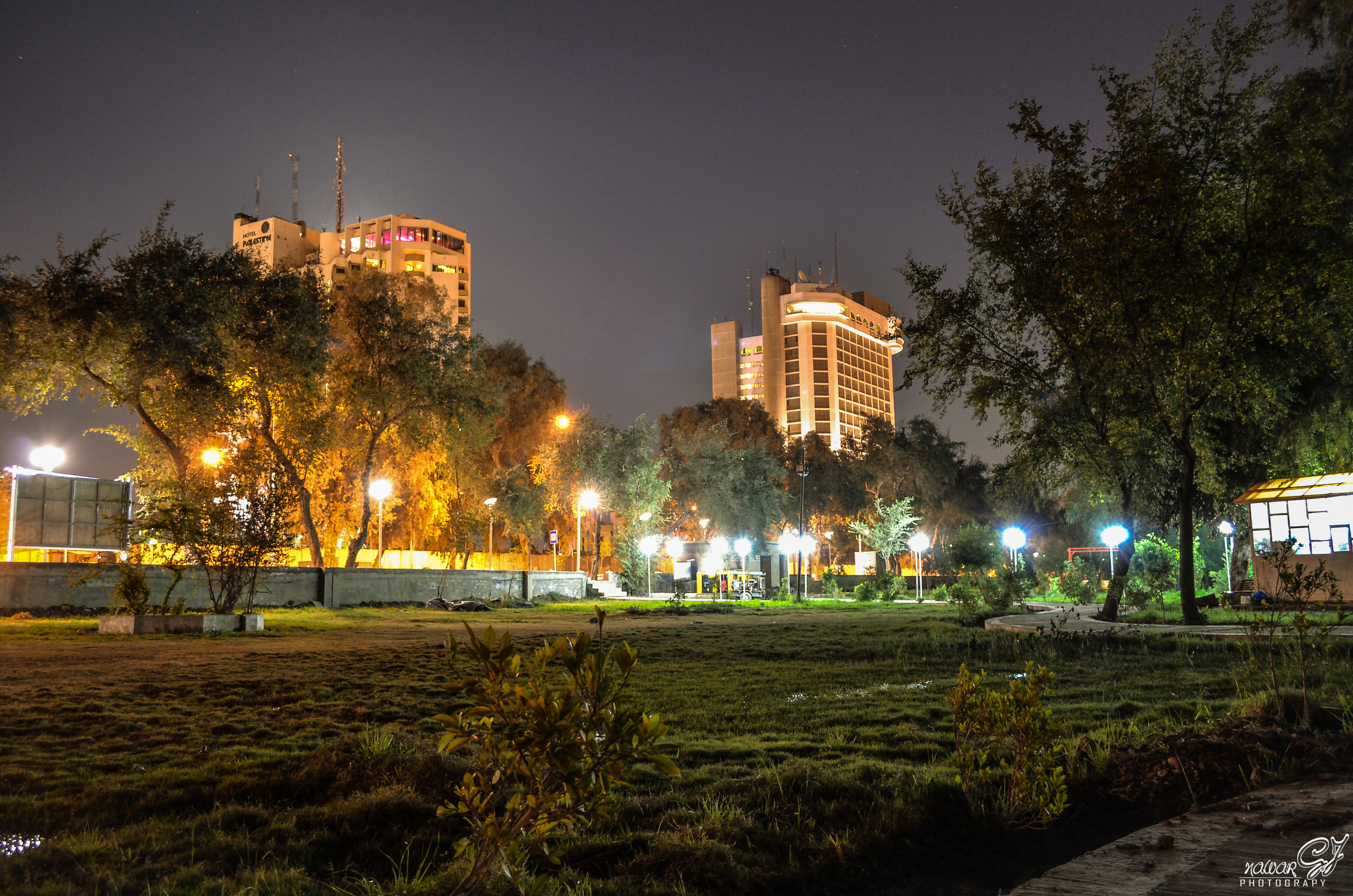
Palestine Hotel and Ishtar Hotel seen from Abu Nawas Corniche

== See also ==
- Baghdad Hotel
- Palestine Hotel
- Al Rasheed Hotel
- Basra International Hotel
