= JK Place =

J.K.Place is a chain of Italian boutique hotels with three locations in Paris, Capri and Rome. The chain was founded in Florence in 2003 by hoteliers Ori Kafri and his father, Jonathan Kafri (the "JK" of JK Place). All three hotels were designed by Florentine architect Michele Bonan, and all three have received Five Star ratings.
