= Isrotel Tower =

Skyscraper hotel in Tel Aviv, Israel

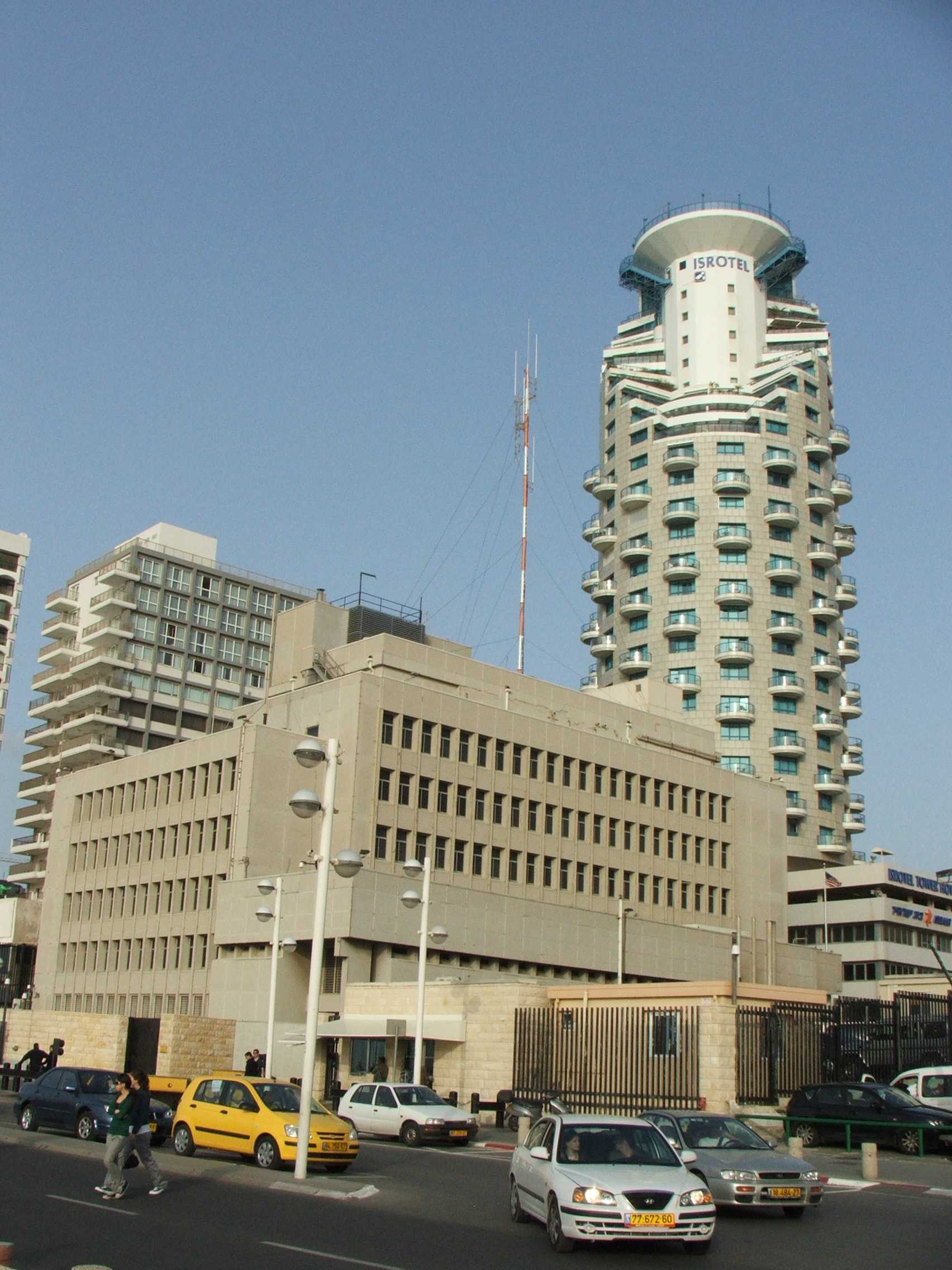
- The Isrotel Tower in Tel Aviv, Israel.
- Interactive map of the Isrotel Tower area

General information
- Status: Completed
- Type: Hotel, Apartments
- Location: Tel Aviv, Israel
- Coordinates: 32°4′36.30″N 34°46′2.74″E
- Completed: 1997
- Opening: 1997
- Cost: $30 million
- Owner: Isrotel

Height
- Roof: 108 m (354 ft)

Technical details
- Floor count: 29

Design and construction
- Architect: A Gvirtzman Architects

The Isrotel Tower is a hotel located on the beachfront of Tel Aviv, Israel.

The tower is 108 meters high and has 29 floors. It is operated by the Israeli Isrotel hotel group. A Gvirtzman Architects designed the towers which were completed in 1966, whilst the main core was completed in the 1980s.

The diameter of the structure is 29 meters and the tower is constructed on the site of the Gan Rina Theatre. The hotel consists of 90 suites whilst the top floors house 62 apartments. The tower is constructed on a narrow pedestal.

The Nakash family purchased the tower for US$150 million in April 2013.

== See also ==
- List of skyscrapers in Israel
- Architecture of Israel
- Tourism in Israel
