= Royal Victoria Hotel, Pisa =

Hotel in Pisa, Italy

Coordinates: 43.71658°N 10.40114°E

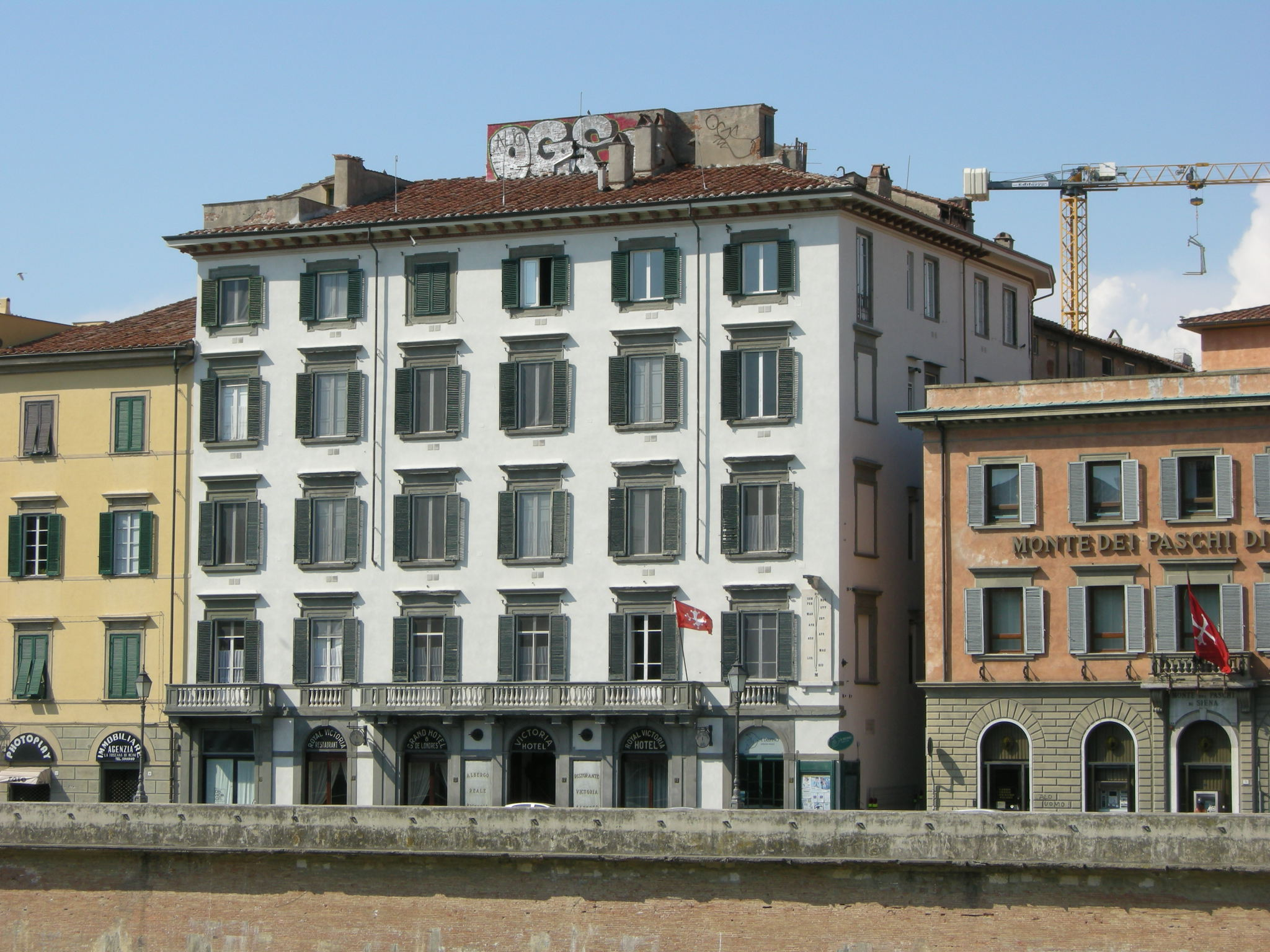
The Royal Victoria Hotel

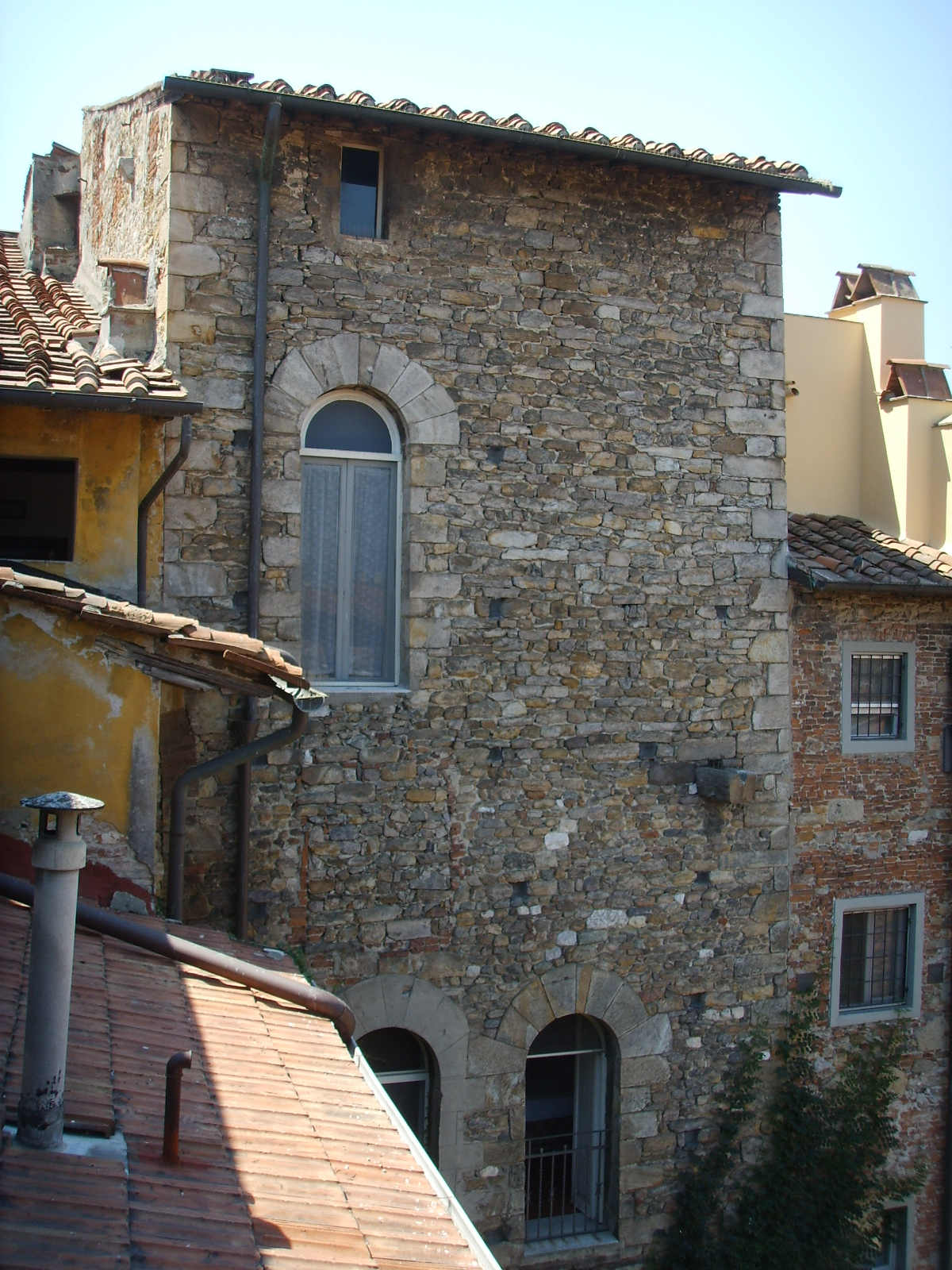
The Torre del lungarno pacinotti (Tower of Victory) is one of the best preserved medieval towers of Pisa, and is now incorporated in the building of Hotel Royal Victoria (torre dell'hotel vittoria)

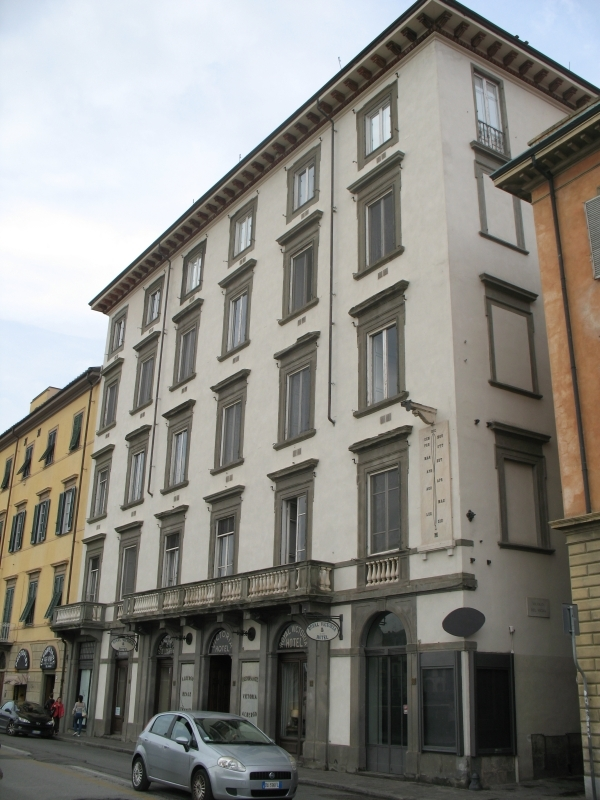
The front view of the Royal Victoria Hotel, Pisa, Oct 2014

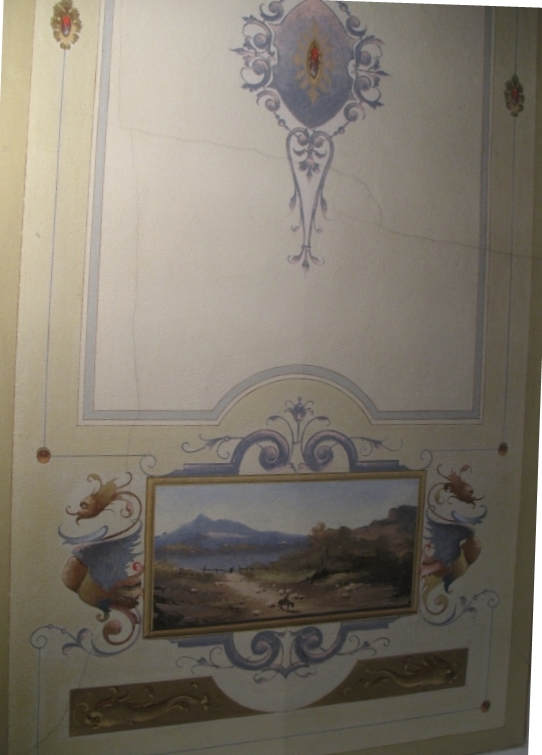
An example of the Art Nouveau frescos painted on the walls and ceilings of the Royal Victoria Hotel, Pisa Italy by Domenico Piegaja between 1896 and 1904. The frescos are slowly being restored after being painted over by the US army in WWII when they occupied the hotel.

The Royal Victoria Hotel is located in the oldest part of the medieval settlement of Pisa on the northern bank of the River Arno. The earliest part of the building is a tower erected by the Winemaker's Guild in the 11th century, which served both as an inn and as their headquarters.

== History ==
The "Universita de Vinajoli" as it was called, later became part of the University of Pisa, when it was called Collegio Vittoriano. This was a period when Pisa was the most powerful city in Tuscany, with a trading empire and colonies around the mediterranean. In the early 16th century when the city state of Florence conquered Pisa, the tavern became known as the Locanda della Vittoria (Inn of the Victory).

In 1837, Pasquale Piegaja (b1794), a citizen of the Duchy of Lucca, purchased the tower and adjacent buildings and over two years renovated the buildings and transformed the old inn into the Hotel Royal de la Victoire. The Piegaja family has run the hotel since 1837.

As a young man Pasquale Piegaja had studied at and graduated from the University of London. While working in London for some years he was introduced to the wealthy travellers going to Italy and began to organise their holidays in Tuscany, renting villas for them. He soon became convinced that it was an opportune time to open a hotel that would meet international standards and that Pisa would be the perfect place for a hotel, having the university, leaning tower, the first railway in Tuscany, the climate and proximity to the sea.

By the 1860s the hotel was well known to tourists on the 'Grand Tour' of Italy. In 1861, Englishman Oliver Blewitt, in his Handbook for travellers in central Italy, complemented the hotel: "The Vittoria, on the Lung'arno, kept by Pasquale Piegaja, who has lived in English families, is an excellent hotel, very clean, with great attention and civility". The name for international guests gradually changed to the "Royal Victoria Hotel" due to the large number of English-speaking tourists visiting throughout the reign of Queen Victoria, though today locals still call it Hotel Vittoria.

== Architecture ==
The present appearance of the facade dates back to 1912, when a tower house on the left side of the building was incorporated into the main building to create a sixth column of windows.

Over the years many changes have been made to the interior of the building. The most significant were by Domenico Piegaja, son of the brother of Pasquale, who had inherited the hotel and had studied architecture. He added the main stone staircases with edges enamelled in white "English" style. He also transformed the apartments, and between 1896 and 1904 installed heating and hot water. In this period Domenico Piegaja also added Art Nouveau decorations on walls, ceilings and some windows, some of which can still be seen today. However, the majority were painted over by the US army which occupied the hotel at the end of WWII.

The hotel is listed as a building and hotel by the Italian Government due to the rarity of its continuous activity and the distinctive features of its construction. The hotel building includes:

- a tower of the 11th century;
- three towers of the 12-13th century;
- two tower houses typical of Pisan modular construction dating from 14-15th centuries;
- a domus, a high medieval church with its cloisters;
- two residential buildings of the 19th century; and
- one wing at the back of the hotel was damaged by bombing during World War II —— and was rebuilt in the early 1950s. However, this was sold in 2009 and is not currently part of the hotel.

== Recognition ==
On April 22, 2013 The Municipality of Pisa named a square after the hotel's founder, Pasquale Piegaia. The Piegaja family still owns and manages the hotel today — the fifth generation of the family.

== Notable guests ==
The hotel has had many illustrious and famous guests, including Charles Dickens, Charles Lindbergh, The Rockefeller family, and Émile Zola, .

== See also ==
- List of hotels in Italy
