= Khanzad Hotel =

Khanzad Hotel & Resort

General information
- Location: Khanzad, Arbil Governorate, Iraqi Kurdistan
- Opening: 2004
- Owner: Nasri Group of Companies
- Management: Nasri Group of Companies

Other information
- Number of rooms: 80
- Number of restaurants: 3

Website
- http://www.khanzadresort.com

The Khanzad Hotel & Resort is a luxury hotel located on a hill in the remote suburb of Khanzad 15 kilometers northeast of Arbil, the capital of the Kurdistan Region in Iraq.

== See also ==
- Erbil International Hotel
- Arbil
- Iraqi Kurdistan
- Arbil International Airport
