= Isrotel =

Hotel chain in Israel

Isrotel Ltd.
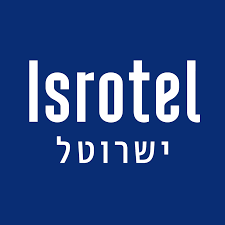
- Type: Public
- Industry: Hospitality
- Founded: 1981
- Founder: David Lewis
- Headquarters: Tel Aviv, Israel
- Number of locations: 21 (2024)
- Area served: Israel
- Key people: Lior Raviv, CEO
- Services: Hotels
- Revenue: ₪743 million
- Total equity: ₪1.36 billion (2020)
- Number of employees: ~4,500 (2022)
- Website: isrotel.co.il

Isrotel Ltd. is an Israeli hotel chain headquartered in Tel Aviv. It operates 21 hotels and resorts throughout the country, most of which are located in and around Eilat.

== History ==
Businessman David Lewis opened the Isrotel King Solomon Hotel in Eilat in 1980. The hotel chain expanded to 12 hotels by 2011 and 19 by 2019. As of 2022, Isrotel operated 22 hotels, and related tourism services, including restaurants, spas, a diving center, and shopping centers. Isrotel plans to increase to 30 properties by 2025.

== List of Hotels ==
Isrotel Collection

- King Solomon Hotel
- Royal Garden Hotel
- Agamim Hotel
- Yam Suf Hotel
- Sport Club Hotel
- Lagoona Hotel
- Riviera Hotel
- Nevo Hotel
- Noga Hotel
- Daroma Hotel (Ramon Inn)
- Kedma Hotel
- Gomeh Hotel
- Ayala Hotel

Isrotel Exclusive

- Royal Beach Eilat Hotel
- Beresheet Hotel
- Cramim Hotel
- Orient Hotel
- Royal Beach Tel Aviv Hotel
- Carmel Forest Spa Resort
- Mitzpe Hayamim Hotel

Isrotel Design

- Sea Tower Hotel Tel Aviv
- Port Tower Hotel Tel Aviv
- Alberto Hotel Tel Aviv
- Gymnasia Hotel Tel Aviv
- Publica Herzliya
