= JK Place Capri =

- Location within Italy

General information
- Location: Capri, Campania, Italy
- Coordinates: 40°33′31″N 14°13′23″E

Other information
- Number of rooms: 22
- Number of suites: 8

JK Place Capri is a 22-room, cliffside luxury boutique hotel on island of Capri, and part of the JK Place hotel chain. It is located in the northeast of Anacapri town, towards the northwest of the island and west of Marina Grande. Established in 2007, the hotel has 22 rooms, and eight suites, and is situated in a restored late 19th century villa which once belonged to wealthy American sisters Sadiee and Kate Woolcott-Perry.

Frommer's says of it, "Great attention to detail, elegance, and beautiful views have made a winner of this hotel, in spite of its less-than- desirable location on the main road from the harbor up to Capri and Anacapri." The decor is described as "avante garde", with "zebra skin stools and high-end Florentine furniture." Dorling Kindersley describes it as Capri's chicest hotel with "classical statues, quirky objects, black and white photos and art books."

In 2025, La Liste named it one of the world's ten best hotels.
