= Mount of Olives Hotel =

Hotel in Jerusalem

Coordinates: 31°46′45″N 35°14′41.8″E

Mount of Olives Hotel

The Mount of Olives Hotel, located next to the Church of the Ascension on the summit of the Mount of Olives, is an ancient hostelry in Jerusalem.

== History ==
The Church of the Ascension was originally constructed by a Roman noblewoman named Poimenia around AD 390. The adjoining hostelry was built by two Western Christians: Rufinus and Melania, an aristocratic lady of Spanish descent. This first structure was destroyed by the Persians in 614, but replaced by St Modestus shortly thereafter. Around 1150 the establishment was rebuilt under the orders of Bernard de Tremelay, Grand Master of the Knights Templar, and remained a Templar possession until taken over by the Muslims under Saladin in 1187. It has been in Muslim hands ever since, though has always catered mainly for Christian visitors.

Part of the basement of the Templar structure currently serves as the Internet room for hotel guests, and can also be rented out as a meeting room. One of the oldest surviving Baphomet carvings can be seen above the door of the hotel kitchen, at the far end. The rest of the building was renovated in 1960 by its owners, the Khweis family, and replaced with a much larger modern construction.

== Description ==
The hotel has 54 rooms, 11 of which offer a view of Jerusalem from the highest vantage point in the city. In addition to the Church of the Ascension, which adjoins the hotel to the south, the Garden of Gethsemane is approximately a ten-minute walk away to the west, down the steep slope of the Dominus Flevit ("Jesus Wept"). The Old City of Jerusalem is a further ten minutes away (across the busy modern Jericho ring road, which runs through the Kidron Valley), and is entered through the Lions' Gate (St Stephen's Gate) and the Via Dolorosa. Many other Jewish, Christian and Muslim holy sites are also in the vicinity.

The hotel is owned by Ibrahim Dawud.
