= Abbasi Hotel =

Hotel in Isfahan, Iran

Coordinates: 32°39′5″N 51°40′14″E

Abbasi Hotel هتل عباسی
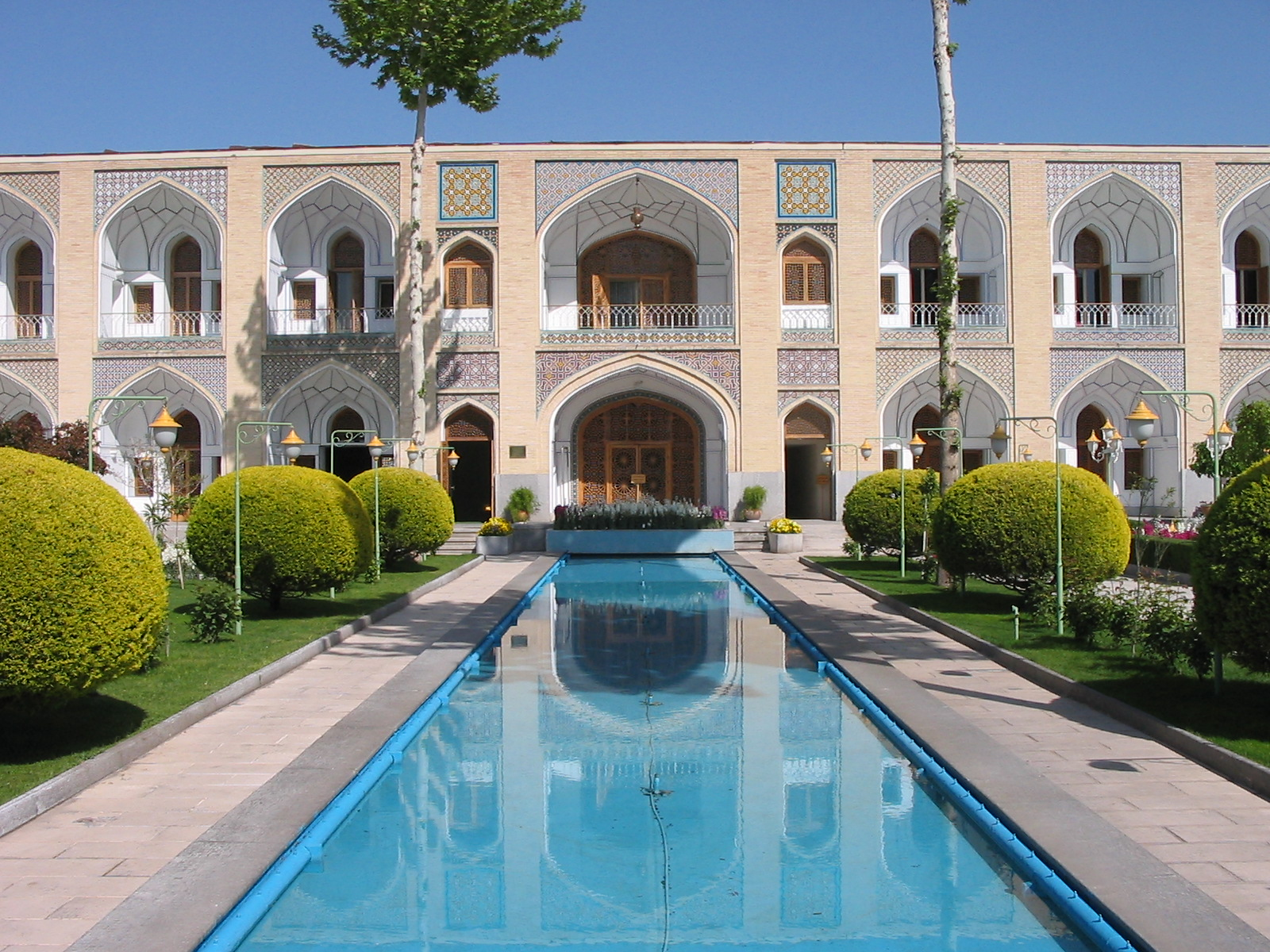
- Interactive map of the Abbasi Hotel هتل عباسی area

General information
- Location: Isfahan, Iran, Amadegah St. Chaharbagh Ave., Isfahan, Iran

Other information
- Number of rooms: 186
- Number of suites: 27
- Number of restaurants: 9

Website
- http://www.abbasihotel.ir/

The Abbasi Hotel (Persian: هتل عباسی, formerly known as the "Shah Abbas Hotel", Persian: هتل شاه عباس) is a hotel located in Isfahan, Iran.

The whole complex was built at the time of king Sultan Husayn of Safavid to provide lodging for travelers.

Upon the suggestion of French André Godard (1881–1965), an archaeologist, architect, and historian of French and Middle Eastern Art., the Cultural Heritage Organization of Isfahan and insurance company by Civil Engineer A.Mohit decided to proceed with the renovation of the caravansary.

The 1974 film And Then There Were None, starring Oliver Reed and Elke Sommer, was shot here.

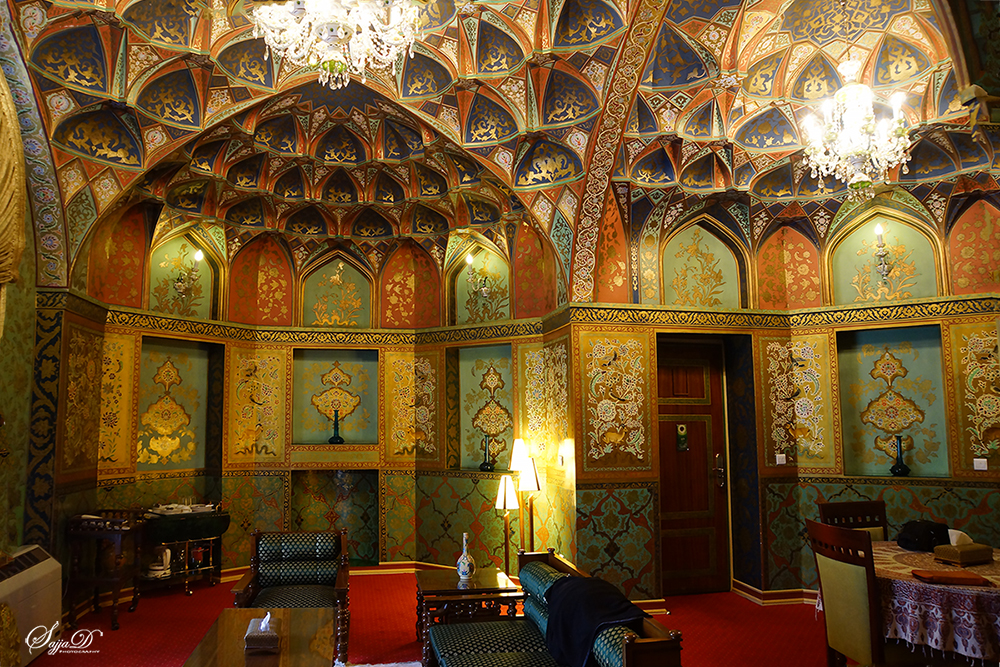
Inside one of the hotel's rooms

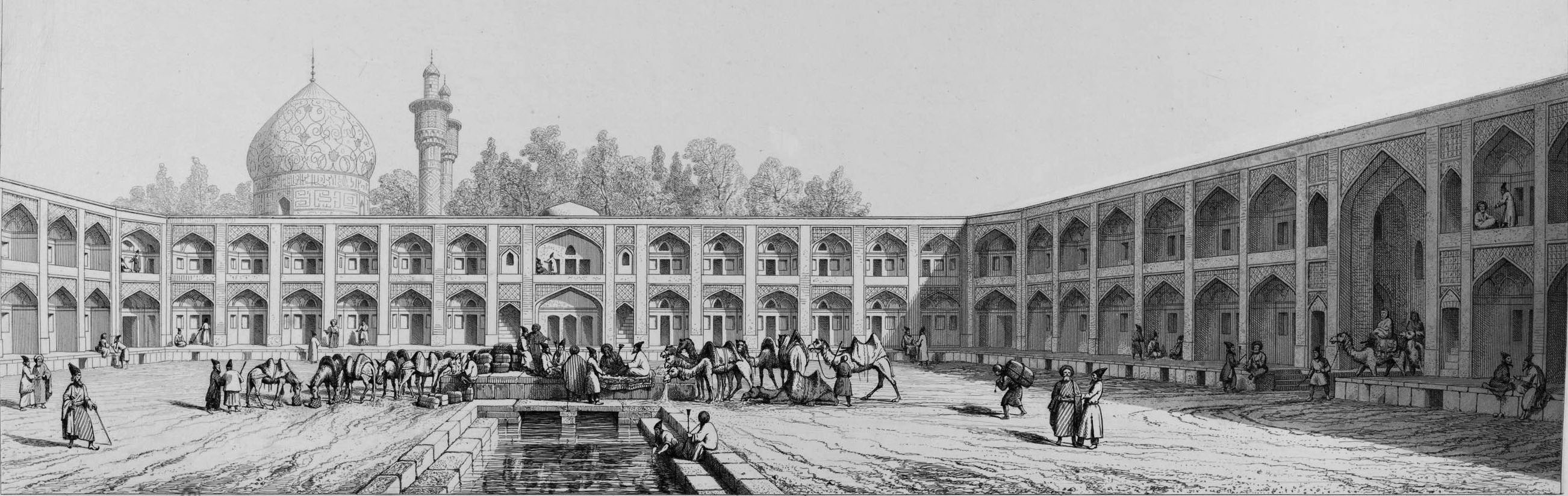
The caravanserai as in 1840

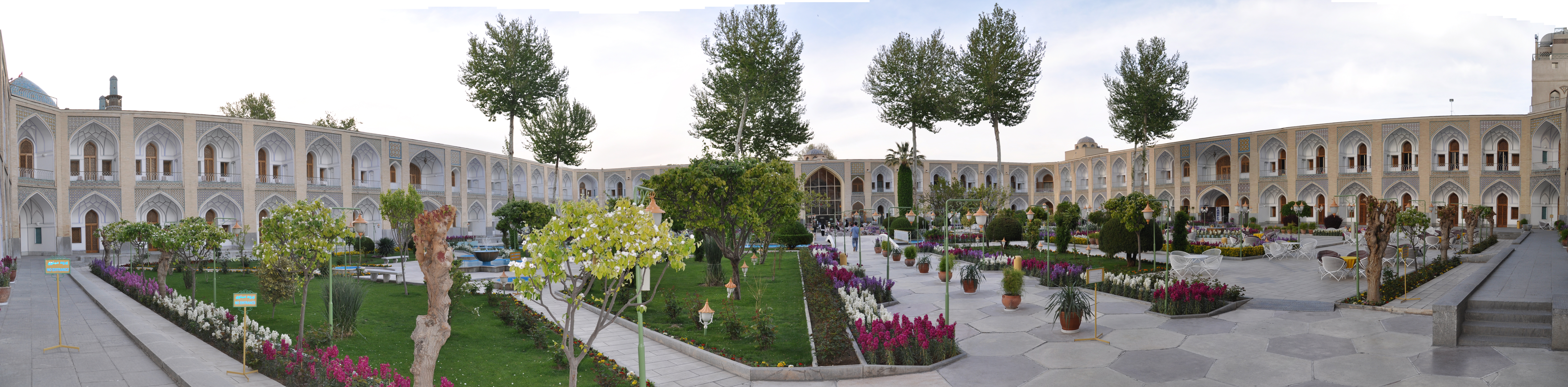
The Abassi Hotel as of 2010
