= Erbil International Hotel =

Iraqi luxury hotel

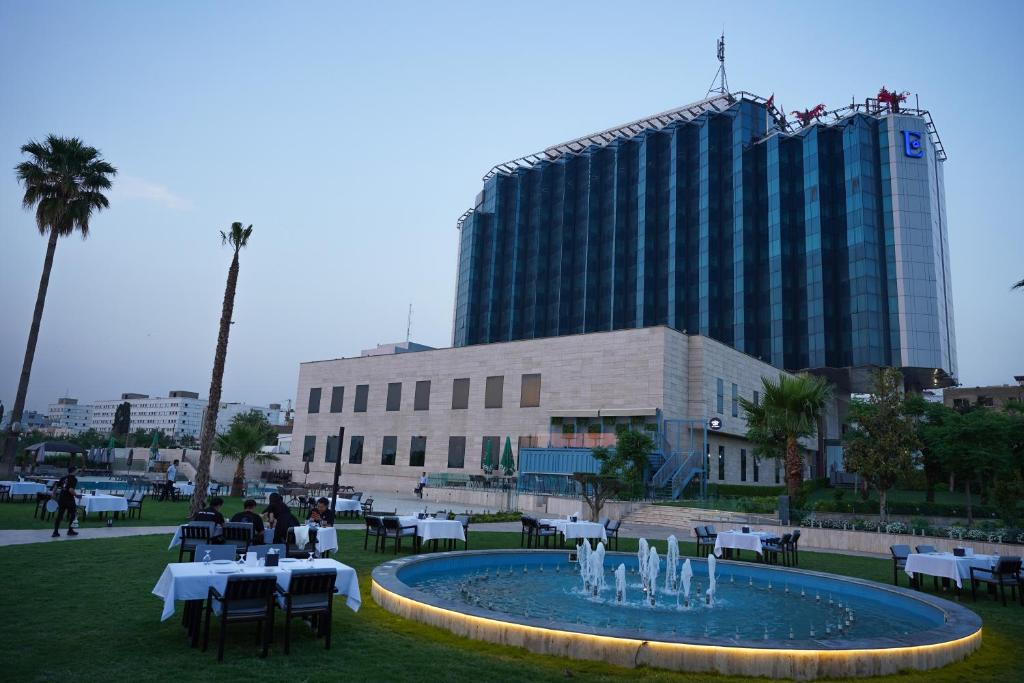
- The shiny facade of Erbil International Hotel.

General information
- Location: 30 Meter Street, Erbil, Iraqi Kurdistan
- Coordinates: 36.1811°N 44.0113°E
- Opening: 2004
- Owner: Nasri Group of Companies
- Operator: Nasri Group of Companies

Other information
- Number of rooms: 167
- Number of restaurants: 6

Website
- Official website

The Erbil International Hotel is a luxurious hotel based in Erbil, the capital of the Kurdistan Region. The hotel was constructed and completed in 2004 and is since then the first 5-star hotel in Kurdistan and Iraq by western standards. The hotel is located at the 30 Meter Street, 2 kilometers from the historical citadel of Erbil. The hotel has a good connection to Erbil International Airport by having an Airport Transfer service.

== See also ==
- Erbil
- Erbil International Airport
- Khanzad Hotel
