= Torre di Moravola =

Coordinates: 43°22′05″N 12°22′36″E

Torre di Moravola

The Torre di Moravola is a 10th-century medieval watch tower built in Umbria, central Italy, to guard the southern approaches of Montone by the Fortebraccio, a condottieri family of the Renaissance. Positioned on a hill top ridge, Madonna di Confine, overlooking the Carpini valley 450 metres above sea level, this strategic site served the dual purposes of holding the high ground and allowing the knights stationed there views of approach routes.

On observing an approaching enemy the knights would signal Montone via line of sight. The warning time was sufficient to allow the citizens of Montone to retreat to defensive positions.

== Architecture ==
Ancillary structures clustered around the central tower housed the garrison's knights and horses. Over the centuries the architecture has reflected the use of the site. Originally a place of worship in the 8th century, additional structures were added for defensive military purposes in the 10th and 12th centuries. Eventually the site was used as a farm, with most of the structures falling into disrepair.

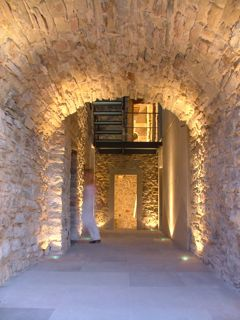
Interior staircase

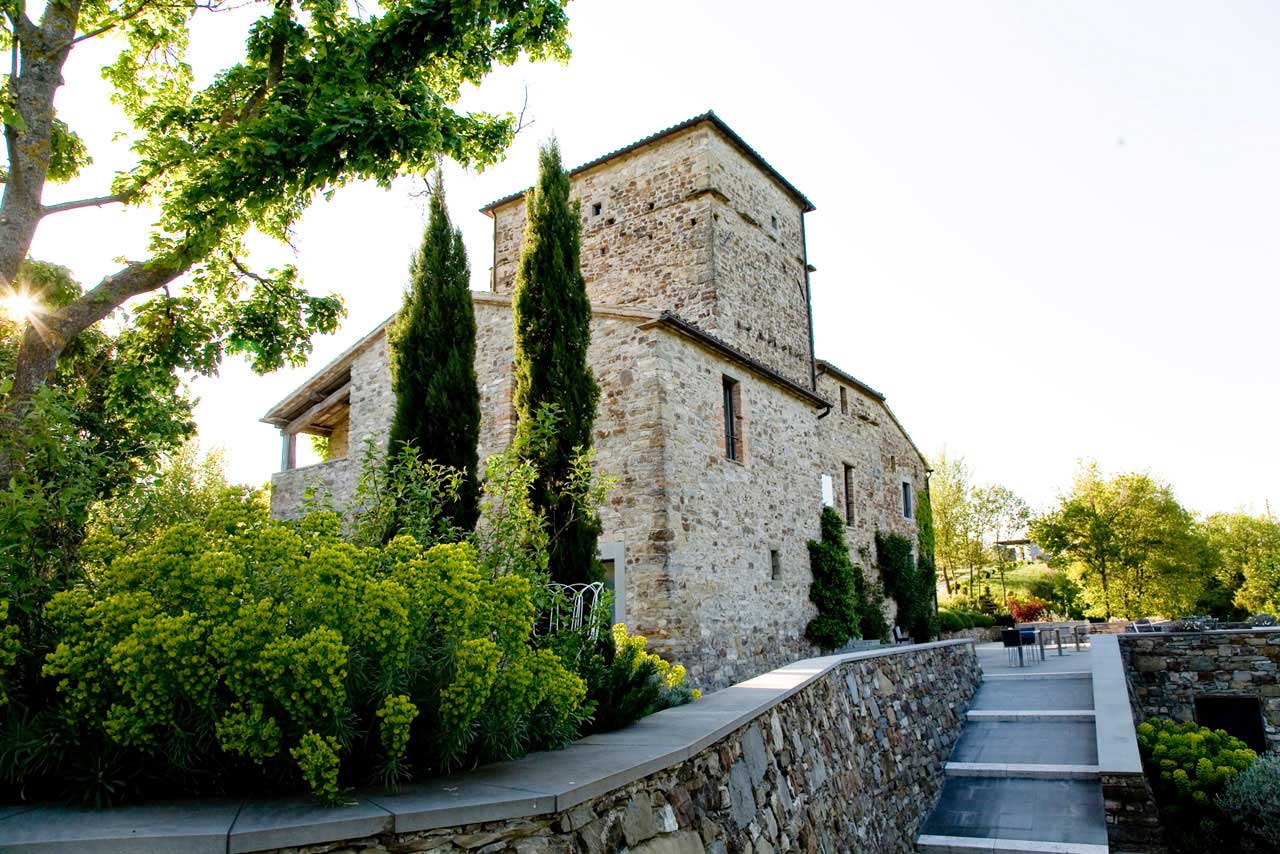
Path leading to Moravola

In 1999 the site was purchased by architect Christopher Chong and designer Seonaid Mackenzie, who embarked on a nine-year renovation program. Chong had worked on projects for James Stirling and Norman Foster, including the shopping areas of Hong Kong International Airport at Chek Lap Kok, Hong Kong. Local Italian construction codes required that new structures be confined to the footprints of existing structures and that basic historical attributes be maintained. The original floors and plans of the main tower had long since been lost, giving the design team a free hand to build, so long as the external building's exterior shell was preserved.

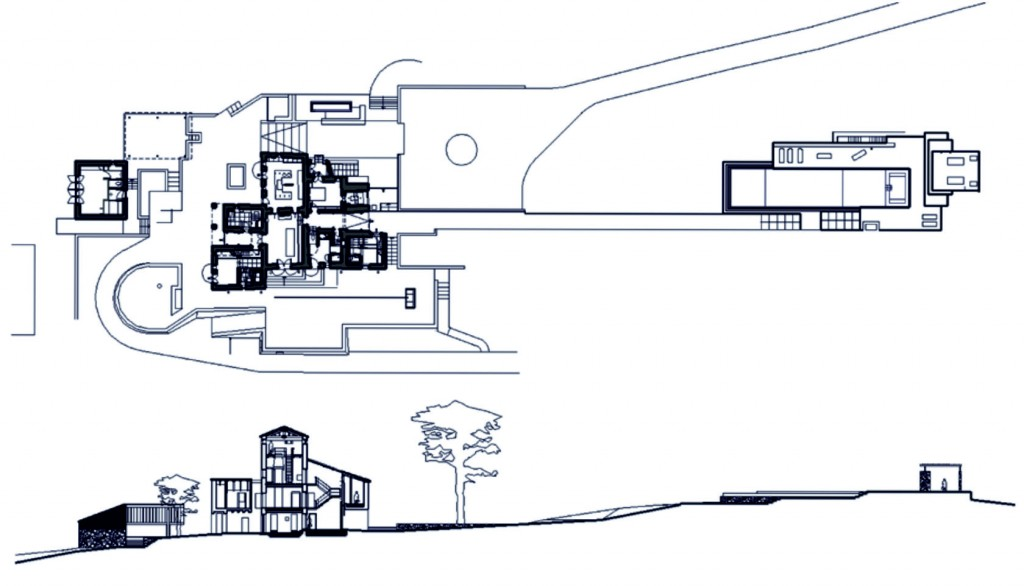
Architecture section and plan

The architectural methodology includes a green approach that neatly integrates with acoustic goals for the property, a spa retreat hotel.

A significant proportion of a building's carbon footprint comes from the manufacture of building materials, and the heating and cooling of a building's interior envelope. Reusing the building's outer shell and foundations reduces the need for new building materials. Heating and cooling is achieved without the need for air conditioning and its associated acoustic noise intrusion. In the summer, the most popular time for visitors, the tower is cooled naturally by three thermodynamic features. The seven tower suites are built around a central staircase tower core, whose height gives rise to natural convection currents that draws cool air from lower levels and exhausts hot air at the rooftop. Secondly, the thermal mass of the 12th-century tower stone exterior provides a thermodynamic reservoir, absorbing energy during the day, and releasing that energy during the cooler nights. Finally, the location of the tower on a hill top ridge allows it to escape the higher temperatures of the valley below.

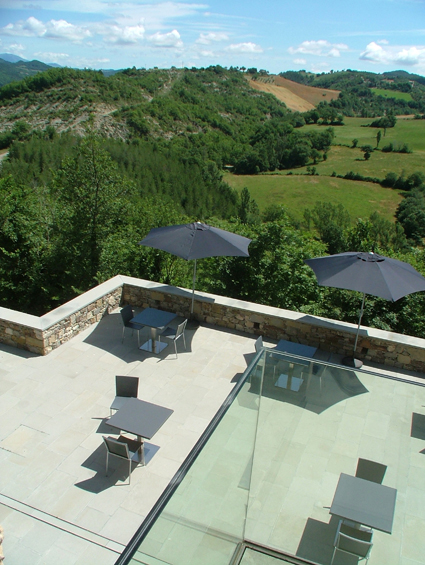
Terrace overlooking Carpini valley

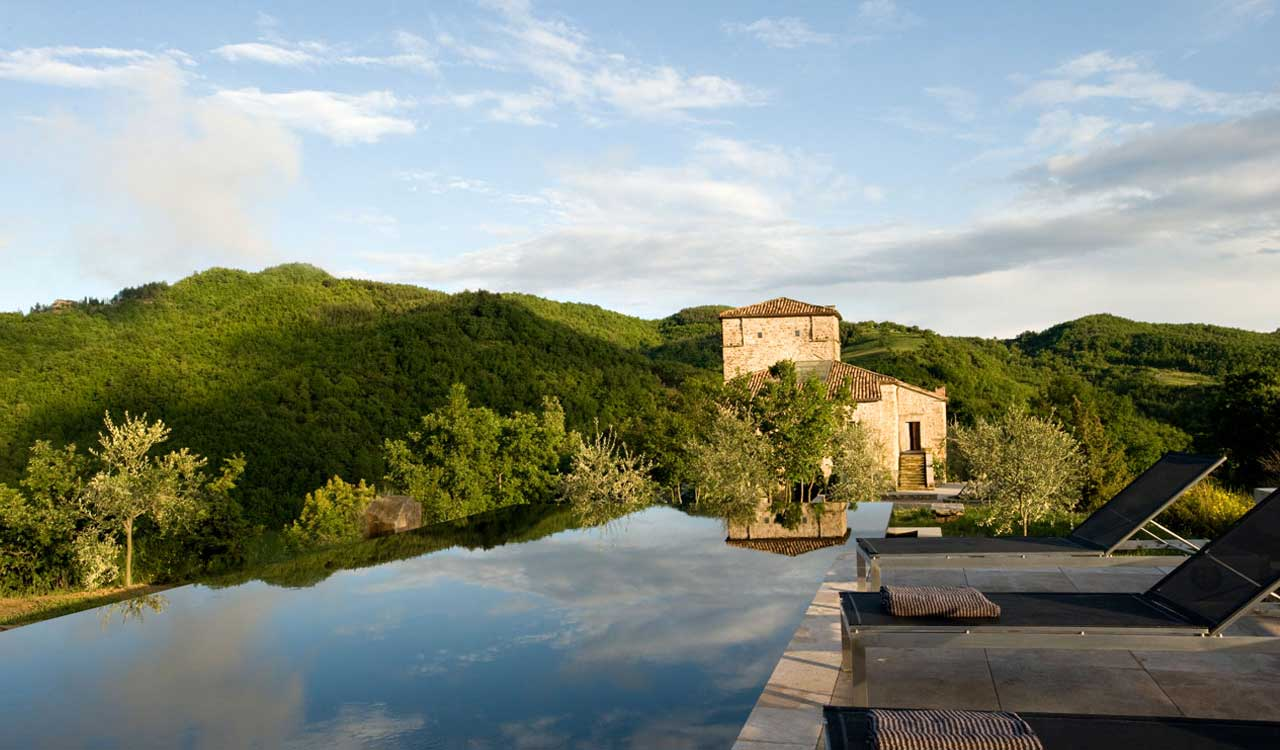
Swimming pool

The swimming pool is located on a higher elevation, south of the main tower building (see section and plan). The pool walls are painted the unusual color black, to enhance the optical properties of the pool's infinity edge. The tower, when viewed from the south poolside pavilion, is seen to be rising as if from a castle's moat. Solar evacuated tube collectors are used to provide pool and building heating efficiently, due to the near optimal thermal load matching of solar energy in low temperature difference applications.

An eleven kilowatt solar array is neatly installed on the flat roof top Pavilion supplying up to 30% typical demand load, when not dedicated to supplying power to the three phase Tesla charger. On a sunny day the array provides sufficient power to zero-carbon emissions charge a Tesla Model X in about six hours. Faster three hour charging is also possible however some of that power is sourced from the grid.

Local building materials were used whenever possible, in particular pietra serena, a blue-grey stone from a local quarry. This stone is the same as is used on the floors of Apple stores worldwide. The use of local stone, stone being a relatively heavy building material, has a significant reduction on trucking costs and environmental impact. One of the more novel uses of Pietra Serena is for the sinks and baths. In order to achieve the high precision required CNC machine tools were used to custom cut and shape solid stone blocks. The use of stone floors also allows for the use of a hydronic underfloor heating and cooling system, with the advantages of silent operation and good efficiency, because of the emissivity and absorpivity of stone.

Interior stairs in the duplex suites make use of materials originally engineered for exterior applications. The custom designed stairs are constructed of COR-TEN B steel (ASTM A 588), giving them a durable rustic appearance. The rustic theme is also mirrored in the wood grain patterns imprinted in the concrete walls. All concrete structures are constructed using concrete forms, usually made of steel. The resulting finish of steel shuttered concrete can be extremely precise, an example of which is Tadao Ando's Church of the Light. The cost is high, however, because each steel form needs to be custom made, and then positioned accurately. Moravola's walls used wooden forms, which, in addition to the cost savings, allowed easy fabrication within the existing historical 10th-century structure.

The tower interiors have been restored with a modernistic design approach that complements auxiliary buildings, terraces and pool areas to create a contemporary retreat. The structures are aligned on an axis with the tower to maximize panoramic views over the Carpini valley, a view unchanged since medieval times, and an escape from the modern world.
