= Iceland Parliament Hotel =

Hotel in Reykjavik, Iceland

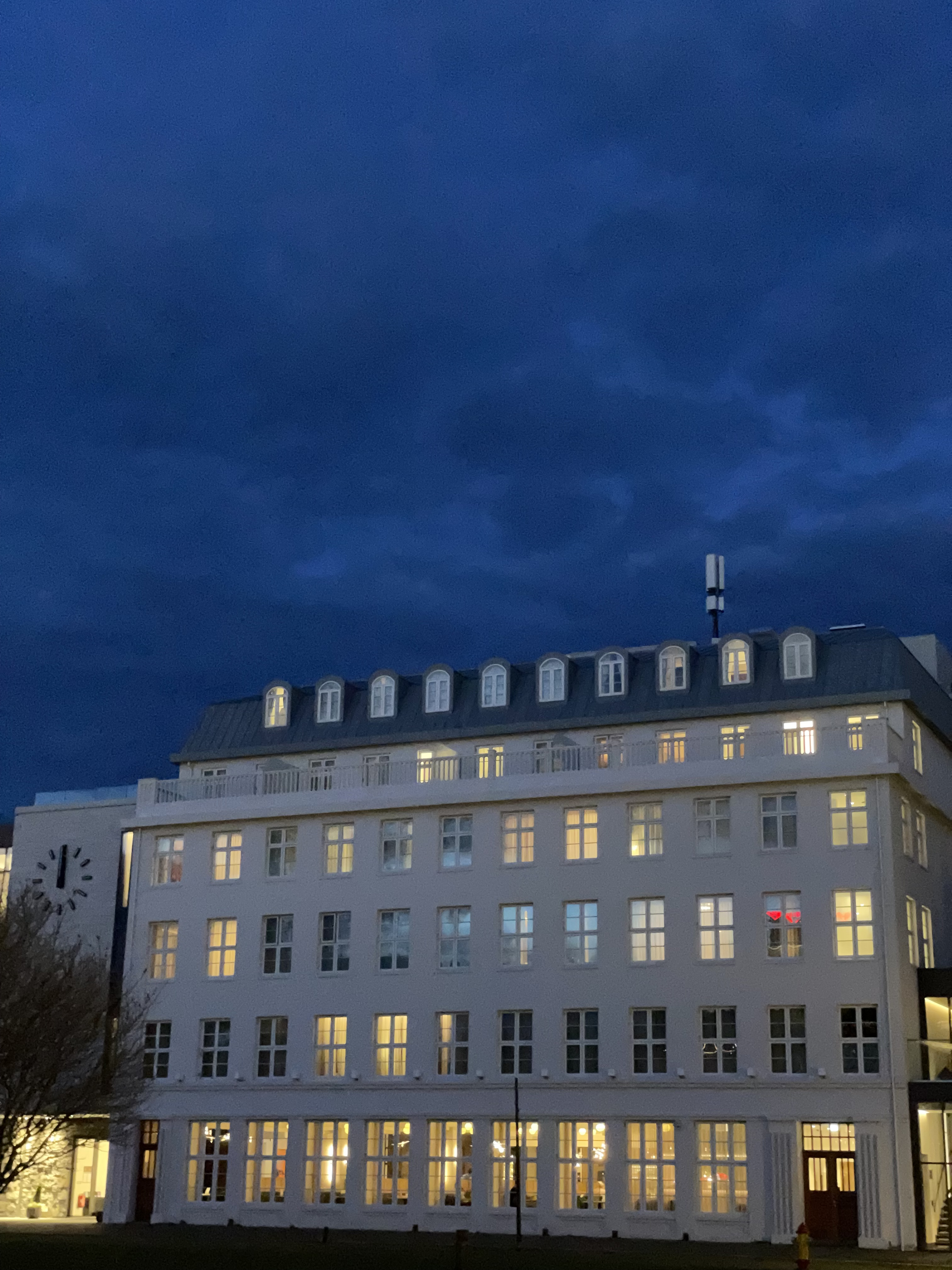
- The Hotel as seen from Austurvöllur Square
- Interactive map of the Iceland Parliament Hotel area
- Hotel chain: Curio Collection by Hilton

General information
- Location: Reykjavík, Iceland, Thorvaldsenstræti 2–6
- Coordinates: 64°08′48″N 21°56′25″W
- Year built: 2016–2022
- Opening: 27 December 2022
- Operator: Iceland Hotel Collection by Berjaya

Technical details
- Floor count: 7
- Lifts/elevators: 8

Design and construction
- Architect: THG Arkitektar
- Developer: Lindarvatn ehf

Other information
- Number of rooms: 161
- Number of suites: 2
- Number of restaurants: 1
- Number of bars: 2

Website
- Iceland Parliament Hotel

Iceland Parliament Hotel, Curio Collection by Hilton, is a 163-room hotel located in central Reykjavík, Iceland, by the Icelandic Parliament, Alþingi. It is managed by Iceland Hotel Collection by Berjaya through a franchise agreement with Hilton Worldwide. The hotel is situated in a complex of seven rebuilt and new buildings. Three of downtown Reykjavík's main squares surround the building, with Austurvöllur to the east, Ingólfstorg to the north, and Víkurgarður to the west.

Initially scheduled to open in 2018, the hotel faced construction delays and the impact of the COVID-19 pandemic. These setbacks delayed the opening timeline, causing the hotel to open on 27 December 2022, by nearly 5 years behind schedule.

== Architecture ==
The hotel is made up of seven buildings. These include Iceland's former telecommunications headquarters (Landssímahúsið), the first secondary school for women in Iceland (Kvennaskólinn), and the Independence Hall. Other new buildings were added, both serving the purpose of connecting the buildings, but also add to the hotel’s capacity and facilities.

== Controversy ==
In 2017, a controversy arose when a change in the local planning was approved to allow the expansion of the hotel building in Landssímahús into Víkurgarður park on the building's northeast side. The Parish Committee of the Reykjavík Cathedral claimed that the project violated the Cathedral's right of jurisdiction over the ancient Víkurkirkjugarður Cemetery, which had also never been formally exhumed.
