= Basra International Hotel =

Basra International Hotel فندق البصرة الدولي
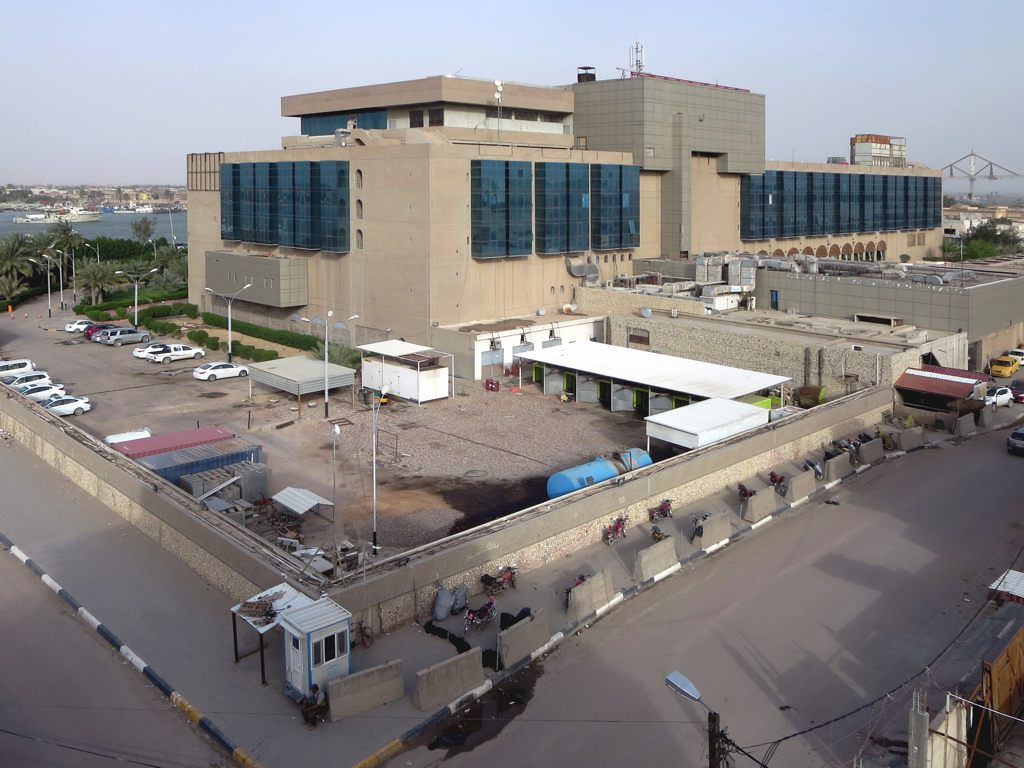
- Interactive map of the Basra International Hotel فندق البصرة الدولي area

General information
- Location: Basra (Iraq)
- Coordinates: 30.517901237189797°N 47.84356000675982°E

Other information
- Number of restaurants: 2

Website
- http://www.basrainternationalhotel.com/

The Basra International Hotel (Arabic: فندق البصرة الدولي) is a hotel on Shatt al-Arab bank in Al Ashar District, in Basrah, Iraq.

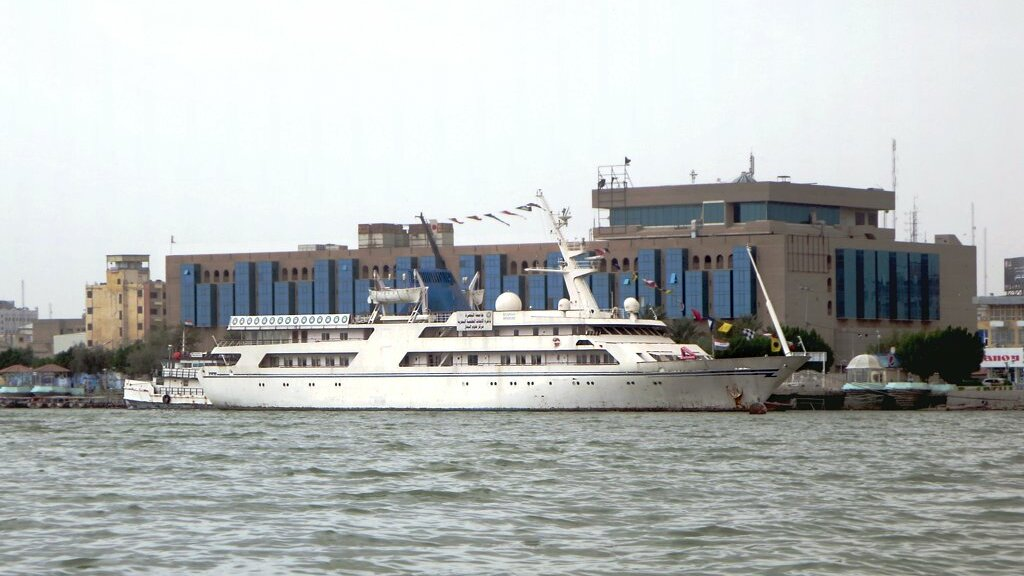
Basra International Hotel seen from the Shatt al-Arab, 2016

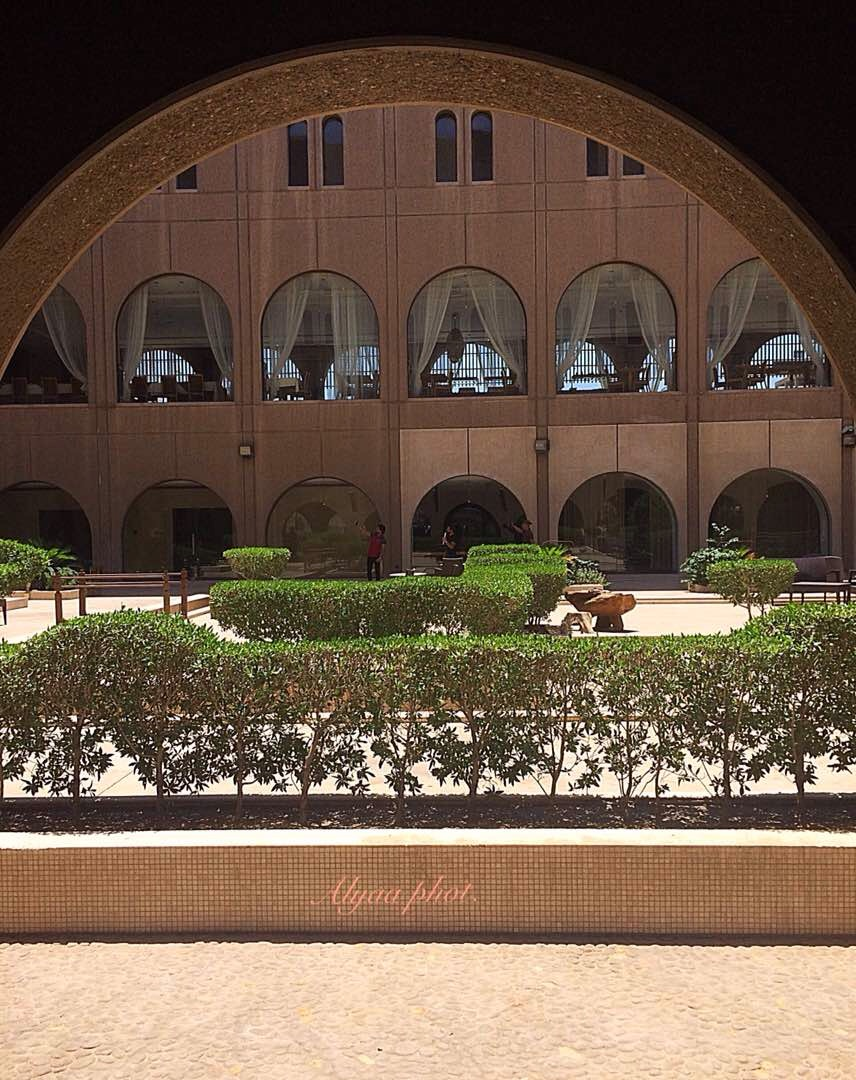
Courtyard of the Basra International Hotel, 2017

The hotel was built in 1981 as the Basrah Sheraton Hotel & Casino. Sheraton severed ties with the hotel in 1991, at the time of the Gulf War, but the hotel continued using the name without permission for the next two decades until it closed after the Iraq War. It was renovated and reopened in 2010 under its current name.

== See also ==
- Royal Tulip Al Rasheed Hotel
- Baghdad Hotel
- Palestine Hotel
