= Giardino di Costanza Resort =

Hotel in Sicily, Italy

The Giardino di Costanza Resort is a hotel in Italy which formerly belonged to the International Kempinski Hotels chain.

The Resort stands among rows of vineyards and olive groves in the western side of Sicily, near Mazara del Vallo, in the province of Trapani.

The Resort is entitled to Constance of Sicily, the last Hauteville.
