= Hotel Florida Milan =

Hotel in Milan, Italy

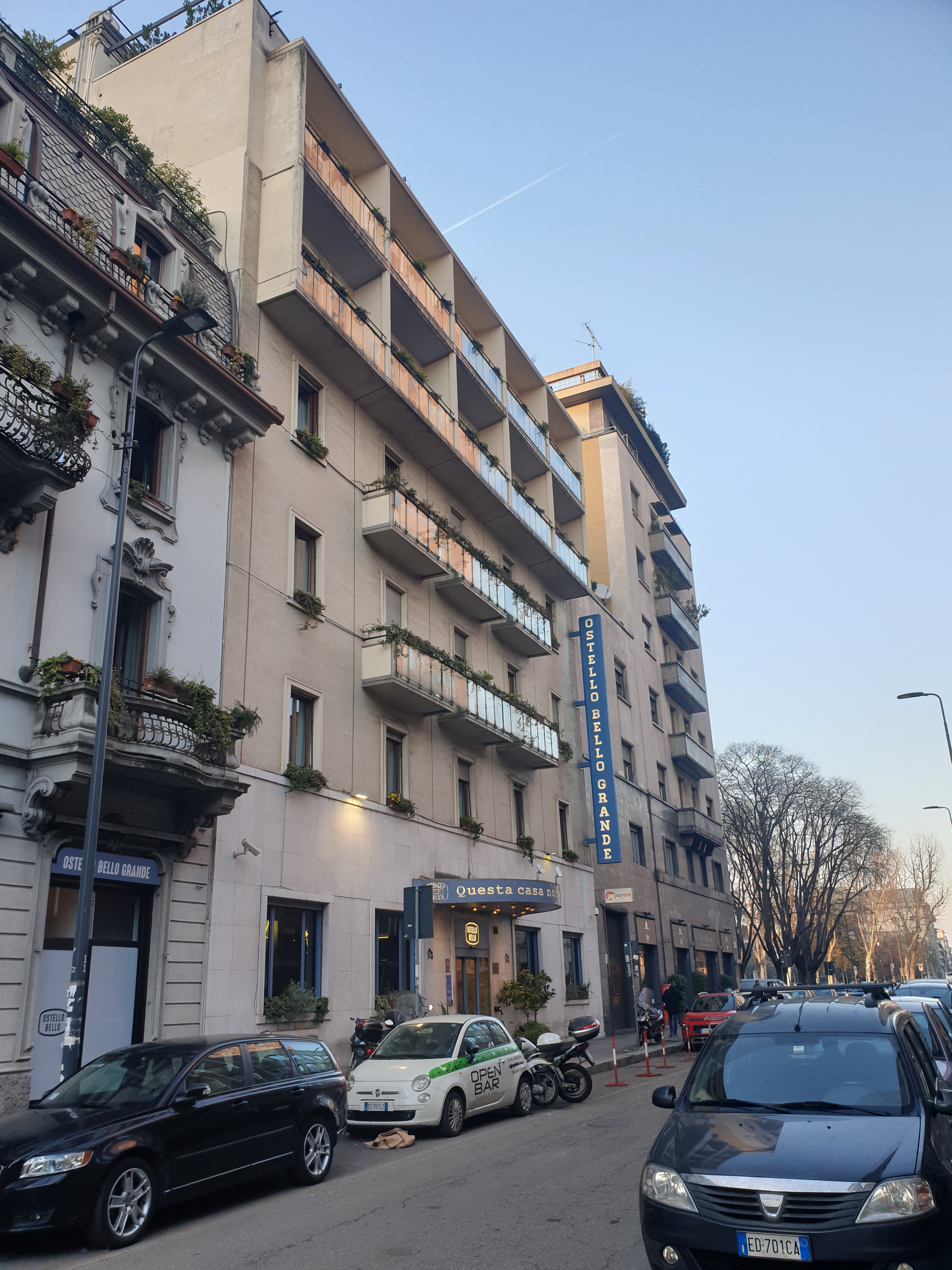
- Hotel Florida Milan

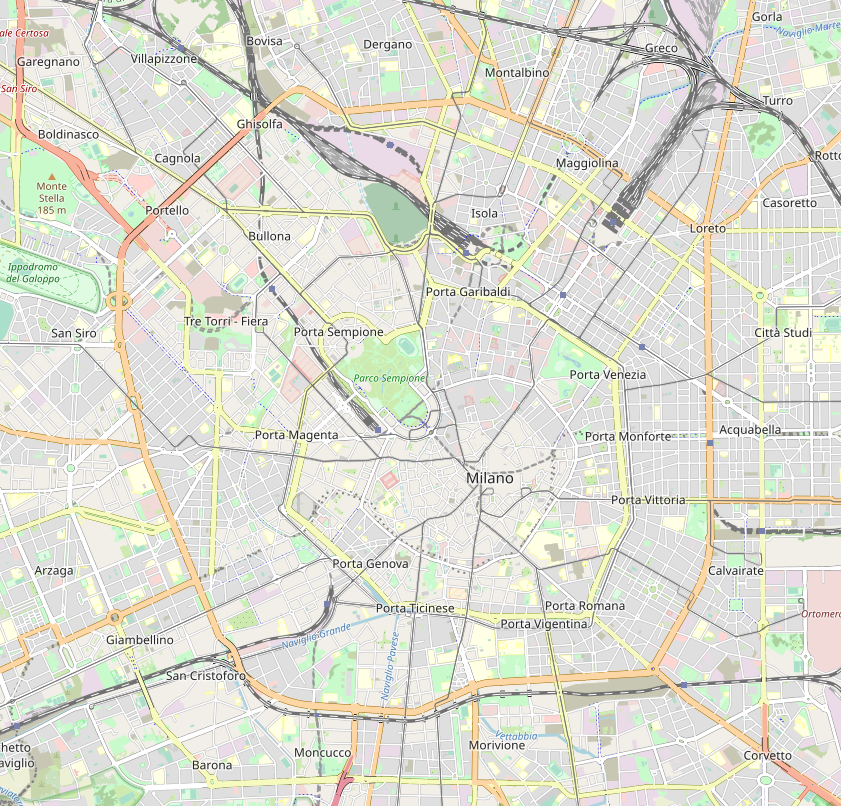
- Location within Milan

General information
- Location: Via Roberto Lepetit, 33 20124, Milan, Italy
- Coordinates: 45°29′3″N 9°12′20″E
- Opening: 1949

Hotel Florida Milan is a hotel in central Milan, Italy, located approximately 50 metres south of the Milano Centrale railway station in the "Stazione Centrale" district. The hotel was originally built in 1949 and was modernised in 2004. The hotel has Italian marble and fine wood furnishings and has a private collection of contemporary art.
