= Baghdad Hotel =

Hotel in Baghdad, Iraq

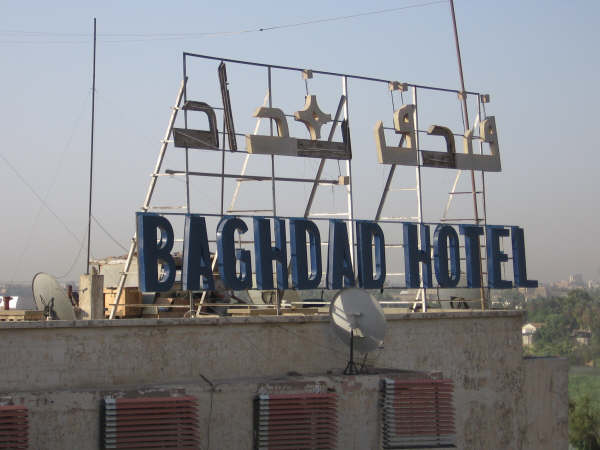

- Location in Baghdad

General information
- Location: Baghdad, Iraq
- Coordinates: 33°19′6.96″N 44°24′53.64″E
- Opening: 1958; 68 years ago

Technical details
- Floor count: 6

Other information
- Number of rooms: 160
- Number of restaurants: 2

Website
- baghdad-hotel.com

The Baghdad Hotel is a five-star hotel in Baghdad, Iraq. Opened in 1958, it is located on Sadoun Street and overlooks the Tigris on its eastern bank, with the Green Zone right across the river, and is not too far away from Firdos Square.

== History ==
Construction of hotel began in 1953 by four Iraqi Christian families. Although the project was a private one, it was built on state-owned land. The Baghdad Hotel held its soft opening in early 1958, with King Faisal II presiding over the ceremony, just a few months before he was executed during the 14 July Revolution. The grand opening followed on September 5, 1958, attended by revolutionary leader and then-Prime Minister Abdul-Karim Qasim. In the years that followed, Baghdad Hotel witnessed the reception of delegates and artistic and cultural figures from across the Arab world. One of the hotel's famous guests was Abdel Halim Hafez, who stayed at the hotel during his visit to Iraq in 1965. Other famous patrons included Sabah, Fahd Ballan, Samira Tewfik, Mariam Fakhr Eddine, and Amina Rizk.

The hotel was nationalized in 1982 and is currently operated by the state-owned Baghdad Hotel Company. After the 2003 invasion of Iraq, Baghdad Hotel was frequented by Western journalists, workers, and American and Iraqi members of the Iraqi Governing Council. On 12 October 2003, the hotel was targeted by a car bombing attack. The bomb-rigged car drove down a side street but was fired by the guards, killing the attacker and six Iraqis, while 32 other people were wounded, including 3 U.S. soldiers. Security officials said that concrete barriers absorbed much of the blast, and prevented the car from destroying the hotel.

Baghdad Hotel celebrated its 60th anniversary in 2018.
