= Deaths in April 2003 =

The following is a list of notable deaths in April 2003.

Entries for each day are listed alphabetically by surname. A typical entry lists information in the following sequence:

- Name, age, country of citizenship at birth, subsequent country of citizenship (if applicable), reason for notability, cause of death (if known), and reference.

== April 2003 ==
=== 1 ===
- Booker Bradshaw, 61, American record producer, actor, and Motown executive, heart attack.
- Lloyd L. Brown, 89, American writer, activist and labor organizer.
- Richard Caddel, 53, English poet, publisher and editor, a key figure in the British Poetry Revival, leukemia.
- Leslie Cheung, 46, Hong Kong actor and singer, suicide by jumping.
- Ted Chilcott, 79, Canadian Olympic rower (1952).
- Marcel Ernzer, 77, Luxembourgish cyclist and Olympian (1948).
- Jean-Yves Escoffier, 52, French cinematographer (Good Will Hunting, Rounders, Nurse Betty), heart attack.
- Sven Holmberg, 85, Swedish actor.
- Ed Kweller, 88, American basketball player.
- Robert M. Levine, 62, American historian and academic, cancer.
- Mendy Morein, 76, Canadian Olympic basketball player (1948).
- T. Ray Richeson, 79, American football player (Chicago Hornets), and coach.
- Mutsuhiro Watanabe, 85, Japanese war criminal during World War II.
- Adriaan Cornelis Zaanen, 89, Dutch mathematician, known for his books on Riesz spaces.

=== 2 ===
- Hilly Flitcraft, 79, American baseball player (Philadelphia Phillies).
- Seymour Friedman, 85, American film director.
- Kaveh Golestan, 52, Iranian photojournalist and artist, land mine.
- Nick Klutka, 82, American football player (Florida Gators, Buffalo Bisons).
- Terenci Moix, 61, Spanish writer, pulmonary emphysema.
- Joan Phipson, 90, Australian children's writer.
- György Révész, 75, Hungarian screenwriter and film director.
- Harold S. Sawyer, 83, American politician (U.S. Representative for Michigan's 5th congressional district), throat cancer .
- Edwin Starr, 61, American soul singer, heart attack.
- Sékou Touré, 68, Ivorian football player.
- Michael Wayne, 68, American film producer and son of John Wayne, heart failure from complications of lupus.

=== 3 ===
- Walter Ashbaugh, 74, American Olympic athlete (1952).
- Homer Banks, 61, American songwriter and record producer ("(If Loving You Is Wrong) I Don't Want to Be Right"), cancer.
- Arthur Guyton, 83, American physiologist, traffic collision.
- Scott Hain, 32, American convict, execution by lethal injection.
- Gunadasa Kapuge, 57, Sri Lankan musician, fall.
- Al MacBain, 77, Canadian lawyer and politician, member of the House of Commons of Canada (1980-1984).

=== 4 ===
- Anthony Caruso, 86, American actor.
- Fred J. Cook, 92, American investigative journalist.
- Izzat Ghazzawi, 51, Palestinian writer.
- Abdul Kadir, 54, Indonesian footballer, kidney failure.
- Michael Kelly, 46, American journalist, columnist and magazine editor, war-related vehicular accident.
- Helmut Knochen, 93, German Nazi official and commander of the SiPo and SD.
- Billy McPhail, 75, Scottish football player, Alzheimer's disease.
- J. Quigg Newton, 91, American lawyer and politician.
- Resortes, 87, Mexican comedian, emphysema.
- Paul Ray Smith, 33, United States Army sergeant and Medal of Honor recipient, killed in action.

=== 5 ===
- Kirby Doyle, 70, American poet.
- Adolf Harder, 76, German Olympic pentathlete (1952).
- Seymour Lubetzky, 104, American cataloging theorist and librarian.
- Frédéric Kibassa Maliba, 63, Congolese politician, heart attack.
- Federico Pizarro, 76, Argentine football player.

=== 6 ===
- David Bloom, 39, American television journalist (NBC News, Weekend Today), pulmonary embolism.
- Anita Borg, 54, American computer scientist, advocate for the advancement of women in computer science, brain cancer.
- José Emeterio Rivas, Colombian radio journalist killed after publicly accusing local officials of corruption, gun shots.
- Gerald Emmett Carter, 91, Canadian Roman Catholic prelate, Archbishop of Toronto (1978-1990).
- Aleksandr Fatyushin, 52, Russian actor, pneumonia.
- Susan French, 91, American actress.
- Leon Levy, 77, American investor, fund manager, and philanthropist.
- Nicole Loraux, 59, French historian of classical Athens.
- Vic Metcalfe, 81, English football player.
- Babatunde Olatunji, 75, Nigerian drummer, recorded Drums of Passion, diabetes.
- Robert John Pratt, 96, Canadian comedian and politician.
- Boris Silchev, 77, Soviet Russian Olympic boxer (1952).
- Ivan Staykov, 76, Bulgarian Olympic cross-country skier (1952).
- Red Stephens, 72, American football player (San Francisco Dons, Washington Redskins).
- Princess Tenagnework, 91, Ethiopian royal and eldest child of Emperor Haile Selassie and Empress Menen Asfaw.

=== 7 ===
- Knud Andersen, 85, Danish footballer.
- Cecile de Brunhoff, 99, French pianist and teacher, created the children's book character Babar the Elephant.
- Dick Doyle, 73, American football player (Pittsburgh Steelers, Denver Broncos).
- David Greene, 82, British television and film director, pancreatic cancer.
- Jutta Hipp, 78, Germen-American jazz pianist and composer, pancreatic cancer.
- Maurice Kouandété, 70, Beninese military officer and politician.
- Julio Anguita Parrado, 32, Spanish journalist and war correspondent (El Mundo), missile strike.
- Laymon Ramsey, 85, American baseball player.
- Robin Winks, 72, American professor, historian, author and diplomat.

=== 8 ===
- Kathie Browne, 72, American film and television actress (Perry Mason, Gunsmoke, Star Trek, The Love Boat).
- Patrick Fani Chakaipa, 70, Zimbabwean prelate of the Roman Catholic Church, Archbishop of Harare (1976-2003).
- Charles Douglass, 93, Mexican-American sound engineer, credited as the inventor of the laugh track, pneumonia.
- Dee Gibson, 79, American basketball player (Tri-Cities Blackhawks).
- Maki Ishii, 66, Japanese composer of contemporary classical music, cancer.
- Spider Martin, 64, American photographer, suicide.
- Franz Rosenthal, 88, German-American professor of Semitic languages.
- Bing Russell, 76, American actor and baseball club owner, cancer.
- Jesse Warren, 88, American baseball player.
- Correspondents killed in the Battle of Baghdad:
  - Tareq Ayyoub, 35, Jordanian journalist for Al Jazeera, missile strike.
  - José Couso Permuy, 37, Spanish cameraman, missile strike.
  - Taras Protsyuk, 35, Ukrainian cameraman, tank fire.

=== 9 ===
- Earl Bramblett, 61, American mass murderer, execution by electrocution.
- Richard Doyle, 80, Canadian journalist, editor, and politician.
- Ray Murray, 85, American baseball player (Cleveland Indians, Philadelphia Athletics, Baltimore Orioles).
- Rod Navarro, 67, Filipino actor.
- Jorge Oteiza, 94, Basque Spanish sculptor, painter, and writer.
- Earl Richardson, 78, American baseball player.
- Robert Wallace Wilkins, 96, American medical researcher.
- Abraham Zabludovsky, 78, Mexican modernist architect (Rufino Tamayo Museum, National Auditorium).
- Vera Zorina, 86, Norwegian ballerina, actress and choreographer (The Goldwyn Follies, Star Spangled Rhythm), stroke.
- Wu Zuguang, 85, Chinese playwright, film director and social critic, stroke.

=== 10 ===
- Abdul-Majid al-Khoei, 40, Iraqi Shia cleric, stabbed.
- Chumy Chúmez, 75, Spanish cartoon humorist, writer and film director, liver cancer.
- Rodolfo Díaz, 66, Argentine Olympic boxer (1956).
- Little Eva, 59, American pop singer (The Loco-Motion), cervical uterine cancer.
- Jack Fincher, 72, American screenwriter and journalist.
- Aatos Fred, 85, Finnish chess player, two-time Finnish Chess Championship winner (1947, 1955).
- Aubrey Jones, 91, British politician.
- Audley Richards, 43, British Olympic bobsledder (1988).
- Martti Sipilä, 87, Finnish cross-country skier and Olympian (1948).
- Franco Valle, 63, Italian boxer and Olympian (1964).

=== 11 ===
- Vasyl Barka, 94, Ukrainian-American poet, writer, and literary critic.
- John Nevill Eliot, 90, English entomologist.
- Vid Fašaić, 91, Croatian Olympic rower (1936).
- Cecil Howard Green, 102, American businessman and founder of Texas Instruments.
- Siddiq Manzul, 71, Sudanese football player.
- Brian Nelson, 55, Northern Irish paramilitary intelligence chief, brain haemorrhage.
- Lucy Saroyan, 57, American actress and photographer, liver cirrhosis.

=== 12 ===
- Clarence W. Blount, 81, American politician.
- Anikó Iglói, 94, Hungarian Olympic alpine skier (1948).
- Charles Janeway, 60, American immunologist.
- Sydney Lassick, 80, American film actor (One Flew Over the Cuckoo's Nest), complications of diabetes.
- Štefan Matlák, 69, Slovak Olympic football player (1964).
- Chalom Messas, 94, Moroccan rabbi and writer.
- Hermann Schreiber, 93, Swiss pilot.
- Joan Sindelar, 71, American baseball player.

=== 13 ===
- Farouk Afero, 63, Pakistani-Indonesian film actor, cancer.
- Majid bin Abdulaziz Al Saud, 64, Saudi prince and member of the House of Saud.
- Sean Delaney, 58, American musician, complications following strokes.
- Allen Eager, 76, American jazz tenor and alto saxophonist, liver cancer.
- Liam Horner, 59 Irish cyclist and Olympian (1968, 1972).
- D. Gale Johnson, 86, American economist and an expert on Russia and China.
- Lucy Shoe Meritt, 96, American classical archaeologist.
- Elder Tadej Štrbulović, 88, Serbian Orthodox elder and author.

=== 14 ===
- Pierre Blondiaux, 81, French rower and Olympian (1952).
- Al Epperly, 84, American baseball player (Chicago Cubs, Brooklyn Dodgers).
- Addie McPhail, 97, American film actress.
- Jyrki Otila, 61, Finnish quiz show judge and member of the European Parliament.
- Milla Sannoner, 64, Italian film and television actress.

=== 15 ===
- Betty Baskcomb, 88, British actress (Everything in the Garden, Afternoon of a Nymph, Doctor on the Go).
- Sherwood Brewer, 79, American baseball player.
- Don Bunce, 54, American football quarterback (Stanford, 1972 Rose Bowl MVP) and orthopedic surgeon, heart attack.
- Erin Fleming, 61, Canadian actress, suicide by gunshot.
- Robert Helmick, 66, American president of the US Olympic Committee, cardiac failure.
- Rebeca Iturbide, 78, Mexican-American actress, gastrointestinal perforation.
- Maurice Rapf, 88, American screenwriter and professor of film studies.
- Franco Scandurra, 91, Italian actor.
- Leonard Tose, 88, American sports executive, owner of the Philadelphia Eagles (1969-1985).
- Keith Walwyn, 47, Kittitian footballer, complications during heart surgery.
- Theodore Weiss, 86, American poet, professor and literary magazine editor.

=== 16 ===
- Jack Donohue, 71, American-Canadian basketball coach.
- Isao Iwabuchi, 69, Japanese football player and Olympian (1956).
- Graham Jarvis, 72, Canadian actor (Misery, Fame, 7th Heaven), multiple myeloma.
- Samuel J. LeFrak, 85, American real estate tycoon.
- Ray Mendoza, 73, Mexican professional wrestler, kidney failure.
- Lili Muráti, 88, Hungarian film and stage actress.
- Danny O'Dea, 91, British actor.
- Jewell Young, 90, American basketball player (Purdue University, Indianapolis Kautskys, Oshkosh All-Stars).

=== 17 ===
- Mario Sandoval Alarcón, 79, Guatemalan politician.
- Robert Atkins, 72, American nutritionist (Atkins Diet), accident.
- H. B. Bailey, 66, American NASCAR driver, heart attack.
- Godfrey Brunner, 81, Canadian Olympic sports shooter (1960).
- Russell Gentry Clark, 77, American district judge (United States District Court for the Western District of Missouri).
- Jean-Pierre Dogliani, 60, French football player.
- Frank Donovan, 84, Welsh footballer and Olympian (1948).
- John Paul Getty Jr., 70, British philanthropist and book collector, chest infection.
- Earl King, 69, American Blues musician/songwriter, complications of diabetes.
- Koji Kondo, 30, Japanese football player.
- Yiannis Latsis, 92, Greek shipping tycoon.
- Ong Poh Lim, 81, Malayan/Singaporean badminton player.
- Jozef Schell, 67, Belgian biologist.
- Hilde Sessak, 87, German actress.
- Ronnie Shanklin, 55, American football player (North Texas Mean Green, Pittsburgh Steelers, Chicago Bears).
- Graham Stuart Thomas, 94, British horticultural artist, author and garden designer.
- Peter Cathcart Wason, 78, British cognitive psychologist, founded the study of the psychology of reasoning.
- Sergei Yushenkov, 52, Russian politician, member of Russian Parliament and critic of President Vladimir Putin, homicide.

=== 18 ===
- Paul Bouveret, 82, French Olympic cross-country skier (1948).
- Rudolf Brunnenmeier, 62, German football player, alcohol-related issues.
- Edgar F. Codd, 79, English computer pioneer, heart failure.
- Jean Drucker, 61, French television executive, heart attack.
- Kiril Gospodinov, 68, Bulgarian stage and film actor.
- Toni Hagen, 85, Swiss geologist.
- Emil Loteanu, 66, Soviet and Moldovan film director.
- Diego Ronchini, 67, Italian road racing cyclist.
- Jos Van Stichel, 75, Belgian Olympic rower (1952).
- Lefty Sloat, 84, American baseball player (Brooklyn Dodgers, Chicago Cubs).
- Nguyễn Đình Thi, 78, Vietnamese writer, poet and composer.
- Juan Bautista Villalba, 78, Paraguayan football player.

=== 19 ===
- Mirza Tahir Ahmad, 74, Pakistani spiritual leader of the Ahmadiyya Muslim movement.
- Cholly Atkins, 89, American dancer and choreographer, pancreatic cancer.
- Nazeh Darwazi, Palestinian freelance cameraman, shot by Israeli soldier.
- Denise Ramsden, 51, English sprinter and Olympian (1976).
- Aurelio Sabattani, 90, Italian cardinal of the Roman Catholic Church.
- Chris Zachary, 59, American baseball player (Houston Colt .45s / Astros, St. Louis Cardinals, Detroit Tigers), cancer.

=== 20 ===
- Debbie Barham, 26, English comedy writer, anorexia nervosa.
- Johnny Douglas, 82, English musician.
- Len Duquemin, 78, British football player.
- Teddy Edwards, 78, American jazz tenor saxophonist, prostate cancer.
- Daijiro Kato, 26, Japanese Grand Prix motorcycle road racer, racing accident.
- Sir Bernard Katz, 92, German-born British Nobel Prize-winning biophysicist.
- Henri Lemaître, 81, Belgian prelate of the Roman Catholic Church.
- Purnell Mincy, 87, American baseball player.
- Richard Proenneke, 86, American naturalist, conservationist, and writer, cerebral hemorrhage.
- Bertram Ross, 82, American dancer and choreographer.
- Cole Weston, 84, American photographer.

=== 21 ===
- Robert Blackburn, 82, American artist and printmaker, one of America's foremost fine art lithographers.
- Balwant Gargi, 86, Indian dramatist, theatre director, and short story writer.
- Ivan Hausen, 75, Brazilian Olympic track and field athlete (1948).
- Nina Simone, 70, American jazz singer, known as the "High Priestess of Soul", breast cancer.

=== 22 ===
- Felice Bryant, 77, American songwriter ("Bye Bye Love", "Wake Up Little Susie", "Raining in My Heart").
- James H. Critchfield, 86, American CIA operative during the Cold War, pancreatic cancer.
- Martha Griffiths, 91, American congresswoman and women's rights activist.
- Ramon Humbert, 64, Luxembourger Olympic sprinter (1960).
- Andrea King, 84, American actress.
- Ola H. Kveli, 81, Norwegian politician.
- Mike Larrabee, 69, American athlete and Olympian (1964), pancreatic cancer.
- John Paluck, 67, American football player (Pittsburgh Panthers, Washington Redskins).
- Len Reid, 86, Australian fighter pilot and politician.
- Fred Schaub, 42, German football player, car accident.
- Yuriy Voynov, 71, Soviet and Ukrainian football player and manager.
- Maria Wine, 90, Swedish-Danish poet and writer.

=== 23 ===
- Abram Bergson, 89, American economist.
- Jim Browne, 72, American basketball player (Chicago Stags, Denver Nuggets).
- Hansgeorg Bätcher, 89, German decorated Luftwaffe bomber ace during World War II.
- Fernand Fonssagrives, 93, French photographer.
- Raymond Galle, 89, French stage and film actor.
- Guy Mountfort, 97, British advertising executive and ornithologist.
- Piet van der Schans, 68, Dutch Olympic equestrian (1972).
- Austin Wright, 80, American novelist, literary critic and academic.

=== 24 ===
- Bob Dunn, 56, British Conservative Party politician.
- Nüzhet Gökdoğan, 92, Turkish astronomer, mathematician and academic.
- Yuri Kholopov, 70, Russian musicologist and educator.
- Gino Orlando, 73, Brazilian footballer, cardiac arrest.
- Belus Smawley, 85, American basketball player (Appalachian State, St. Louis Bombers, Baltimore Bullets) and coach.
- Fuzz White, 86, American baseball player (St. Louis Browns, New York Giants).

=== 25 ===
- Viktor Bushuev, 69, Soviet weightlifter and Olympian (1960).
- Lynn Chadwick, 88, English sculptor and artist.
- Félix Doh, Ivorian rebel leader.
- Jaime Silva Gómez, 67, Colombian footballer.
- Ted Joans, 74, American jazz poet, trumpeter, and painter, diabetes.
- Samson Kitur, 37, Kenyan athlete and Olympic medalist (1992, 1996).
- André Perraudin, 88, Swiss Roman Catholic prelate.
- Borislav Đurović, 51, Montenegrin football player.

=== 26 ===
- Bernhard Baier, 90, German Olympic water polo player (1936).
- Rosemary Brown, 72, Canadian politician (NDP), first black woman elected to a provincial legislature, myocardial infarction, heart attack.
- Mohammed Ghazali, 78, Pakistan Air Force officer and cricket player.
- Max Heral, 76, French Olympic weightlifter (1948, 1952).
- Yun Hyon-seok, 18, South Korean LGBT poet, writer, and activist, suicide by hanging.
- David Lavender, 93, American historian and writer.
- Danny Napoleon, 61, American baseball player (New York Mets).
- Edward Max Nicholson, 98, British environmentalist, a founder of the World Wildlife Fund.
- Josef Reisinger, 63, Austrian Olympic speed skater (1964).
- Johnny Sebastian, 81, American football player (Syracuse Nationals).
- Peter Stone, 73, American screenwriter (Charade, Father Goose, 1776), Oscar and Tony-winner, pulmonary fibrosis.

=== 27 ===
- Peter M. Bowers, 84, American aeronautical engineer, journalist and aviation historian.
- Edward Gaylord, 83, American businessman, media mogul and philanthropist, cancer.
- Edward Loyden, 79, British politician.
- Albert Richards, 78, New Zealand Olympic long-distance runner (1956).
- Piet Roozenburg, 78, Dutch draughts player.
- Elaine Anderson Steinbeck, 88, American actress and Broadway stage manager, wife of John Steinbeck.
- Dorothee Sölle, 73, German liberation theologian, heart attack.
- Juha Tiainen, 47, Finnish hammer thrower and Olympic champion (1980, 1984, 1988), pneumonia.
- Wenzu Vella, 79, Maltese Olympic sports shooter (1960).

=== 28 ===
- Ira Herskowitz, 56, American phage and yeast geneticist, pancreatic cancer.
- Ciccio Ingrassia, 80, Italian actor, comedian and film director, heart attack.
- Tochifuji Katsutake, 56, Japanese sumo wrestler.
- Carmelo Morales, 72, Spanish racing cyclist.
- André Muhirwa, Burundian politician and Prime Minister.
- Charlie Tolar, 65, American gridiron football player (Houston Oilers).

=== 29 ===
- Ron Barclay, 88, New Zealand politician (member of New Zealand Parliament for New Plymouth).
- Janko Bobetko, 84, Croatian general, hailed as a hero of Croatia but charged with war crimes by the U.N.
- John Gilbert Hurst, 75, British archaeologist and pioneer of mediaeval archaeology.
- Etti Plesch, 89, Austro-Hungarian countess, huntress, racehorse owner, and socialite.
- Vasily Tolstikov, 85, Soviet diplomat and Communist Party official.
- Jerry Williams, 79, American radio host, a pioneer of talk radio.

=== 30 ===
- Gbenga Adeboye, 43, Nigerian singer, comedian and radio host, kidney-related disease.
- Ferdinand P. Beer, 87, French-American mechanical engineer and university professor.
- Possum Bourne, 47, New Zealand rally car driver, racing accident.
- Francesca Calvo, 53, Italian politician, mayor of Alessandria (1993–2002).
- Aureliano Chaves, 74, Brazilian politician.
- Chris Crowe, 63, English football player.
- Vasile Deheleanu, 92, Romanian football player.
- Joe Túri, 46, Hungarian equestrian and Olympian (1988).
- Lionel Wilson, 79, American voice actor (Courage the Cowardly Dog), pneumonia.
