= Contents of the United States diplomatic cables leak (Americas) =

Contents of the United States diplomatic cables leak depict subjects in the Americas extensively. The leaks, which began on November 28, 2010, occurred when the website of WikiLeaks—an international new media non-profit organisation that publishes submissions of otherwise unavailable documents from anonymous news sources and news leaks—started to publish classified documents of detailed correspondence — diplomatic cables — between the United States Department of State and its diplomatic missions around the world. Since the initial release date, WikiLeaks released further documents every day.

== Bahamas ==
=== Anna Nicole Smith ===
In a November 15, 2006, diplomatic cable, U.S. Ambassador to the Bahamas John D. Rood wrote, "Not since the Category 4 Hurricane Betsy hit the island in 1965, has one woman done as much damage in Nassau", referring to the Anna Nicole Smith scandal in 2007. The diplomatic cable also reports that many government institutions and figures including, "Doctor's Hospital, the Coroner's Court, the Department of Immigration, local mega-lawyers Callenders and Co., formerly popular Minister of Immigration Shane Gibson, and possibly Prime Minister Perry Christie's PLP [(Progressive Liberal Party)] government remained in disarray resulting from the scandal unearthed over Smith's Bahamian residency application and the death of her son", Daniel.

== Brazil ==
=== Military protection of natural resources ===
An American ambassador stated that Brazil remained "paranoid" over its ability to retain claims to the Amazon rainforest and oil reserves, despite the knowledge that there are "no international threats" over them. The ambassador's rationales for Brazilian President Luiz Inácio Lula da Silva's actions is that they "serve the practical purpose of tasking the military with developing greater capabilities" while remaining "politically popular white elephants."

=== Guantanamo Bay prisoners ===
The Brazilian government refused to receive detainees from the Guantanamo Bay detention camp.

=== Counter-terrorism efforts ===
The Brazilian government has obscured from the public an anti-terrorism cooperation with the U.S. and officially denies that Islamic militants are present in its territory. Brazilian authorities are concerned about terrorist activity in its territory, despite contrary public statements, according to a diplomatic cable, dated October 2009, sent from the U.S. Embassy in Brasília to the U.S. State Department.

=== 2005 murder investigation ===
The U.S. Federal Bureau of Investigation was involved in the investigation of the 2005 death of Dorothy Stang — an American-born, Brazilian member of the Sisters of Notre Dame de Namur religious institute, who was murdered in Anapu, Brazil. The U.S. government feared corruption among Brazilian police would harm the investigation.

=== Gol Transportes Aéreos Flight 1907 air crash ===
According to documents sent by the U.S. Embassy in Brasília to the U.S. State Department in November 2006, some Brazilian diplomats pressured the Federal Justice to allow American pilots Joseph Lepore and Jan Paul Paladino, involved in the 2006 Gol Transportes Aéreos Flight 1907 air crash, to return to their country of origin. In the accident, considered the second worst of commercial aviation in Brazil, 154 people died.

=== Article 98 Agreement refusal ===
The Brazilian government refused to sign an "Article 98 Agreement" with the U.S., which resulted in a cut of the IMET budget for the country. As a result, Brazil had to reduce drastically the number of Armed Forces personnel sent to train in the U.S., while it established military training treaties with France, Britain, China, India, and South Africa.

=== Refusal of funding the War in Afghanistan ===
In September 2008, the U.S. Embassy sought to borrow $5 million from the Brazilian government for its military forces in the War in Afghanistan. The money would have been sent over five years, but the request was denied by the Foreign Ministry.

== Canada ==
=== Anti-American sentiment ===
U.S. diplomats in Ottawa wrote to Washington that the Canadian Broadcasting Corporation has "gone to great pains to highlight the distinction between Canadians and Americans in its programming, generally at our expense". The diplomat goes on to state that "while the situation hardly constitutes a diplomatic crisis," it is "noteworthy as an indication of the kind of insidious negative popular stereotyping we are increasingly up against in Canada." The cable concludes that there is a "need to do everything we can to make it more difficult for Canadians to fall into the trap of seeing all U.S. policies as the result of nefarious faceless U.S. bureaucrats anxious to squeeze their northern neighbour."

=== Canada-Cuba relations ===
A cable from Jonathan D. Farrar had criticized Canadian Minister Peter Kent on his recent diplomatic trip to Cuba. In the cable, Farrar notes that Kent did not meet with non-government Cubans and "didn't even bother" to publicly call for more freedoms in the country. Farrar notes that Kent left the country "saying little, a style that 'works better for the Government of Cuba.'" Farrar notes that the Canadian government believe that doing anything serious about promoting democracy in Cuba under the current regime "could jeopardize the advancement of Canada's other interests."

=== Canada-French relations ===
An aide to French president Nicolas Sarkozy told a U.S. diplomat that although other European leaders were excluded from a 65th D-Day ceremony, Prime Minister Stephen Harper, as well as British Prime Minister Gordon Brown were invited because their political situations at home made them "exceptional". The aide alleges that Sarkozy said the two leaders "were in such political trouble at home that the survival of their governments was at stake." In the lead up towards the celebration, Harper was fighting a possible opposition-led coalition, that threatened to take down his minority government.

=== Copyright law ===
Several cables from the United States Embassy in Ottawa shows that they "remains frustrated by the Government of Canada's continuing failure to introduce — let alone pass — major copyright reform legislation that would, inter alia, implement and ratify the World Intellectual Property Organization Internet Treaties." The cables also shows a sustained effort by the U.S. on their lobbying of copyright laws in Canada.

=== Counter-terrorism efforts ===
Jim Judd, former director of the Canadian Security Intelligence Service (CSIS) complained about Canada's courts and general public to U.S. Counselor of the State Department Eliot A. Cohen in Ottawa on July 2, 2008. He ascribed Canadians as having an "Alice in Wonderland" view in regards to global terrorism, whose judges have tied CSIS "in knots", making it ever more difficult to detect and prevent terror attacks in Canada and abroad. The same memo also notes how CSIS officers have been "vigorously harassing" known Hezbollah members in Canada, but that the agency's assessment was that no attacks were "in the offing."

Judd is also quoted telling Cohen that Canadian spies had prior warning that an explosion at Sarpoza Prison in Kandahar, Afghanistan was being planned by the Taliban. However, Judd stated that the spies "could not get a handle on the timing". This contradicts later accounts made by Foreign Affairs Minister David Emerson, who headed an investigation into intelligence failures leading to the prison break, which said Canada did not suspect an attack.

The diplomatic cables also note that Judd views Momin Khawaja and his 'ilk' as outliers, due in part to the fact that Canada's ethnic Pakistani community is not ghettoized and poorly educated like their British counterpart. The ethnic Pakistani community is largely made up of traders, lawyers, doctors, engineers, and others who see promise for themselves and their children in North America, he observed, so its members are unlikely to engage in domestic terror plots. Judd therefore concludes that CSIS main domestic focus is instead on fundraising and procurement, as well as the recruitment of a small number of Canadian 'wannabes' of Pakistani origin for mostly overseas operations."

=== Guantanamo Bay interrogation film ===
Judd commented that cherry-picked sections of the court-ordered release of a DVD of Guantanamo detainee and Canadian citizen Omar Khadr would likely show three Canadian adults interrogating a kid who breaks down in tears. He observed that the images would no doubt trigger "knee-jerk anti-Americanism" and "paroxysms of moral outrage, a Canadian specialty", as well as lead to a new round of heightened pressure on the government to press for Khadr's return to Canada. He predicted that Harper's government would nonetheless continue to resist this pressure.

=== Iraq War ===
A cable notes that for domestic political reasons, Canada has decided not to join in an American-led coalition in Iraq, although they are prepared to be as helpful as possible in the military margins. The same cable revealed that Canadian diplomat James R. Wright met with American and British officials at the Department of Foreign Affairs and International Trade headquarters on the same day the Canadian government publicly refused to participate in the Iraq War. During their meeting, Wright had emphasized that contrary to public statements from the Prime Minister, Canadian military assets stationed in the Strait of Hormuz will also be available to provide escort services in the Straits and Canadian naval and air forces can provide clandestine military support during the pending U.S.-led assault on Iraq and its aftermath.

== Ecuador ==
=== Immigration policy ===
The former Costa Rican director of immigration Mario Zamora complained in 2008 that the Ecuadorian "open doors" policy with foreigners was causing instability for the whole region. His concern was shared by ministers from El Salvador, Guatemala, and Panama.

=== Widespread corruption ===
In a 2009 diplomatic cable released by WikiLeaks and published by El País in April 2011, U.S. Ambassador Heather Hodges said that "corruption among Ecuadorian National Police officers is widespread and well-known" and that "U.S. investors are reluctant to risk their resources in Ecuador knowing that they could be targeted by corrupt law enforcement officials." The leaked cable resulted in a major diplomatic spat, resulting in the expulsion of U.S. Ambassador Hodges from Ecuador and the reciprocal expulsion of Ecuadorian Ambassador Luis Gallegos from the U.S.

== El Salvador ==
=== McDonald's court case ===
McDonald's tried to delay the U.S. government from implementing the Dominican Republic – Central America Free Trade Agreement (DR-CAFTA) in order to put pressure on El Salvador to appoint neutral judges in a company's $24m (£15.5m), ten-year legal battle.

== Haiti ==
=== United Nations stabilisation mission in Haiti ===
Brazil's army leads MINUSTAH, a 12,000-strong peacekeeping mission in Haiti. According to cables, the army is frustrated with the lack of an exit strategy.

=== Minimum wage ===
In 2011 WikiLeaks leaked info that showed the Obama administration fought to keep Haitian wages at 31 cents an hour when the Haiti government passed a law raising its minimum wage to 61 cents an hour.

== Honduras ==
=== 2009 Honduran coup d'état ===
A cable from the U.S. Embassy in Tegucigalpa, Honduras, definitively characterizes the June 2009 ousting of President Manuel Zelaya as "an illegal and unconstitutional coup". The decisiveness of the cable was not reflected in Clinton's reluctance to use such terminology in public statements and the U.S. State Department's failure to cut off all aid save "democracy assistance", as required by law in the case of a coup.

== Jamaica ==
=== Caribbean drug trafficking ===
A diplomatic cable from the U.S. Interests Section in Havana, Cuba, written by Jonathan D. Farrar, Chief of Mission, documents Cuban claims that Jamaica allows drug smugglers to go about freely in Caribbean waters. According to the leaked cable, Cuban ministers complain that Jamaican coast guards "stand idly by". Furthermore, Cuban attempts to express frustration are ignored and met with "complete lack of cooperation". A subsequent British-organised meeting between the two nations ended with complaints that the Jamaican officers "just sat there and didn't say anything".

=== Citizenship issues of members of parliament ===
A diplomatic cable from the U.S. embassy in Kingston discussed an ongoing controversy between the ruling Jamaica Labour Party and opposition People's National Party over alleged foreign citizenships held by their respective MPs. The cable was released to the public in May 2011. One particularly controversial revelation therein was that Sharon Hay-Webster, who in August 2009 had publicly announced that she would renounce U.S. citizenship, had in fact visited the embassy days later to withdraw her renunciation, and remained a U.S. citizen. The incident led Hay-Webster to resign her party membership, and she faced calls from both party members and the public to step down from parliament entirely.

== Panama ==
In August 2009, the U.S. ambassador to Panama, Barbara J. Stephenson, wrote in a diplomatic cable that Panamanian president Ricardo Martinelli had asked her for help with wiretaps and "he clearly made no distinction between legitimate security targets and political enemies". A copy of the cable was published by WikiLeaks in December 2010. Martinelli's administration stated that it had "never asked for help to tap telephones of politicians". Martinelli was later charged and acquitted of tapping the phones of political opponents and journalists while president.

== Peru ==
=== Cocaine trafficking allegations ===
A 2009 cable from the U.S. Embassy in Lima, Peru, states that the chief of the Peruvian Army, General Paul Da Silva, met in 2007 with fishing-industry executive Rolando Velasco possibly to coordinate drug shipments. Velasco was later arrested for trying to export 840 kg (1,852 pounds) of cocaine hidden in frozen fish. Da Silva has denied the charges, arguing that he met Velasco about a possible contract to supply calamari to the army.

== United States ==
=== Guantanamo Bay detention camp ===
The U.S. bargained with other nations on moving prisoners from the Guantanamo Bay detention camp to other countries. In one case, U.S. officials allegedly offered Slovenia a meeting with U.S. President Barack Obama, if the country accepted one of the Guantanamo Bay detainees. Offers to other countries include economic incentives or a visit from Obama.

=== Copenhagen global climate change summit ===
In 2009, the U.S. manipulated — via spying, threats, and bribes — the Copenhagen global climate change summit to coerce reticent participants into supporting the treaty. The U.S. punished countries such as Ecuador and Bolivia, which were deemed "unhelpful" for not signing the Copenhagen Accord, by cutting off millions of dollars in necessary funds; while, the U.S. relieved Saudi Arabia, the world's second-biggest oil producer and one of the twenty-five-richest countries in the world, of any kind of obligation. The U.S. used funds in millions of dollars to recruit the Maldives to sign the Copenhagen Accord, after it has relentlessly taken a stand against it.

=== Bacha bazi in Afghanistan ===
In December 2009, DynCorp, a government contractor which is funded by U.S. tax dollars, officially sponsored a Bacha bazi for entertainment in Afghanistan. Bacha bazi is considered child prostitution, where "young boys are dressed up in women's clothing, forced to dance for leering men, and then sold for sex to the highest bidder."

=== April 8, 2003, journalist deaths ===
A cable, authored by Eduardo Aguirre, revealed that the U.S. government's obstruction of justice in the ongoing case of José Couso against the three U.S. soldiers, Shawn Gibson, Philip Wolford, and Philip DeCamp. The U.S. has pressured the Spanish justice system to drop the case and prevent any further investigation. José Couso was a Telecinco cameraman who was shot dead on April 8, 2003, in Baghdad, when a U.S. army tank knowingly opened fire on the Palestine Hotel.

=== GMO food in Europe ===
Cables revealed that the US government supported Monsanto in selling genetically modified organisms (GMOs) in Europe, where controversy over GMOs is strong. In a specific 2007 cable, the US ambassador to France, Craig Roberts Stapleton, recommended "retaliation" against European "targets" in order to defend Monsanto.

=== Kidnapping and torturing of Khalid El-Masri ===
A cable, directed to the then Secretary of State Condoleezza Rice, revealed the U.S. government's obstruction of justice in the case of Khalid El-Masri, a German citizen who was kidnapped by the CIA, and then flown to Iraq and Afghanistan, where he was allegedly tortured and imprisoned, and then dumped in Albania two weeks after it was revealed he was innocent. The U.S. pressured Chancellor Merkel's German government to drop any charges made against the 13 involved CIA agents and prevent any further investigation of the matter.

== Venezuela ==
=== Nuclear policy ===
John Caulfield, the deputy chief of mission at American embassy in Caracas had minimized Hugo Chávez's plans to build nuclear reactors in Venezuela. "Although rumours that Venezuela is providing Iran with Venezuelan-produced uranium may help burnish the government's revolutionary credentials, there seems to be little basis in reality to the claims" he reported to Washington in one cable.

=== FARC ===
A cable sent from the U.S. embassy in Brasília on November 13, 2009, reported that Nelson Jobim, Brazil's Minister of Defence, "all but acknowledged presence of the FARC in Venezuela".

=== Public healthcare ===
A cable sent from the U.S. embassy in Caracas on December 14, 2009, explains what the embassy considers to be the situation of the Venezuelan public-health system and the government actions related to the public-health sector. This in the context of raised protests in private and public hospitals with motivation in the perceived failure of Barrio Adentro, a social-welfare program, with support of Cuban doctors, that seeks to provide comprehensive publicly funded health care, dental care, and sports training to poor and marginalized communities in Venezuela.
