= Ricardo Ortega =

Ricardo Ortega may refer to:

- Ricardo Ortega Fernández (1966–2004), Spanish journalist
- Ricardo Ortega Perrier (born 1951), Chilean politician and commander-in-chief of the Chilean Air Force
