= Tareq Ayyoub =

Palestinian television reporter

Tareq Ayyoub (Arabic: طارق أيوب, romanized: Ṭāriq ‘Ayyūb, also Romanized Tareq Ayoub, Tariq Ayoub, Tarek Ayoub, Tarik Ayub, 1968 – 8 April 2003) was an Arab television reporter of Palestinian nationality, employed by Al Jazeera, and previously by Fox News. Ayyoub was killed in 2003 when two missiles, fired from by an American ground-attack aircraft, struck the Baghdad headquarters of the Al Jazeera Satellite Channel during the 2003 US-led Invasion of Iraq. The Al Jazeera station was clearly marked as a media centre, and the US military had been informed of its location in February.

== Biography ==
Born in Kuwait in 1968, Ayyoub received his Masters in English from Calicut University. Beginning in 1998, he covered the domestic and international politics of Jordan for the English-language Jordan Times.

== Death ==
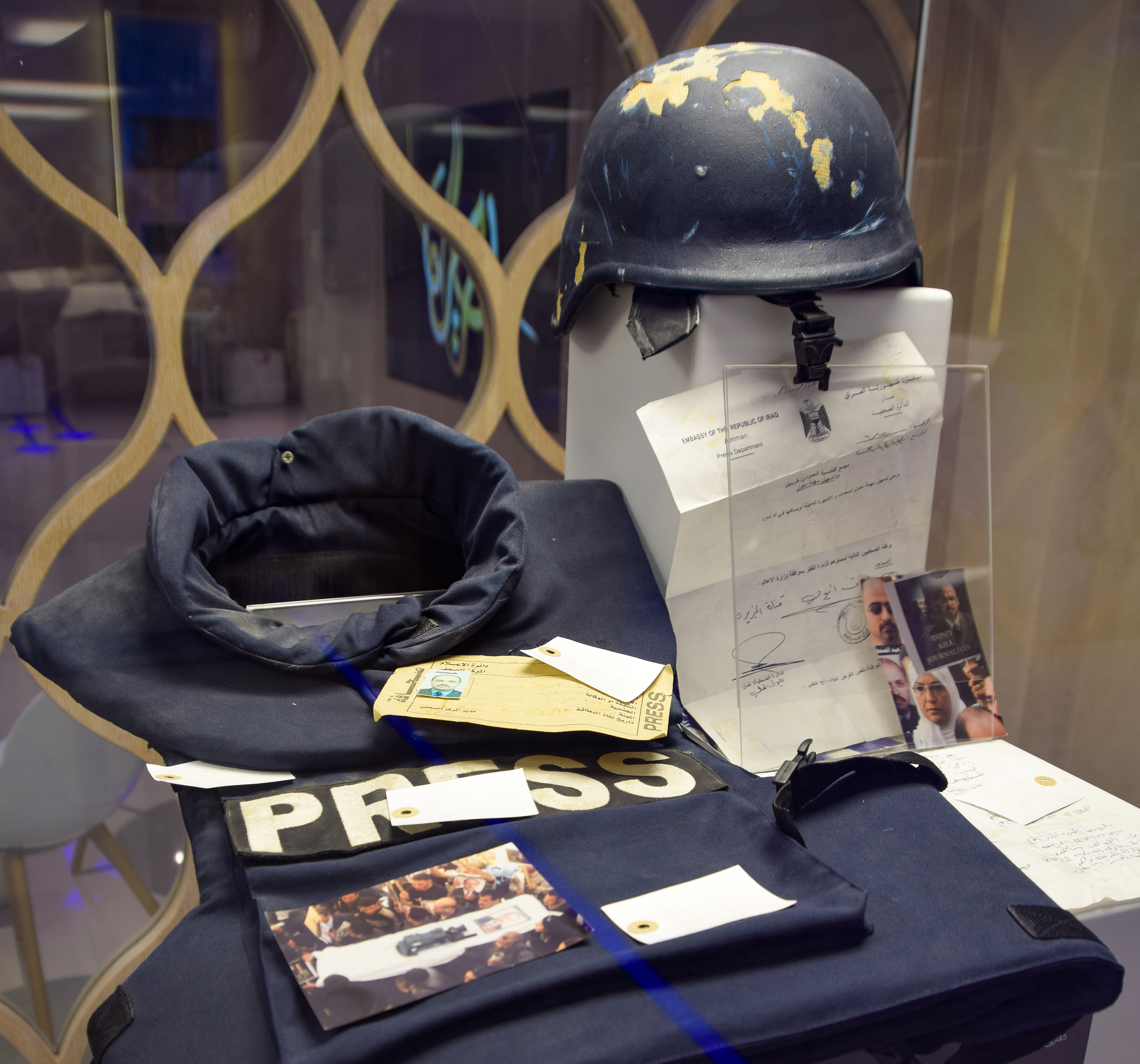
The combat helmet and the bulletproof vest worn by Al Jazeera's Tareq Ayyoub at the moment of his death on display.

On the morning of 8 April 2003, Ayyoub, along with his second cameraman, an Iraqi named Zuheir, was covering a pitched battle between the American and Iraqi troops from the roof of Al-Jazeera's Baghdad office. At approximately 7:45 a.m., an American A-10 Warthog ground-attack aircraft turned toward Al-Jazeera's office and began to descend upon it. Maher Abdullah, the station's Baghdad correspondent, witnessed the A-10's attack run and gave the following description, "The plane was flying so low that those of us downstairs thought it would land – that's how close it was. We actually heard the rocket being launched. It was a direct hit – the missile actually exploded against our electrical generator, and Tareq died almost at once, Zuheir was injured."

== Context ==
On the same day, the Abu Dhabi satellite station was hit by 'Army Fire' in a different section of Baghdad, and an American tank fired shells at Palestine Hotel, killing journalists Taras Protsyuk of Reuters and Jose Couso of the Spanish television station, Telecinco.

== Reaction ==
The United States claimed later that day that the death had been an accident, and that hostile fire had been seen originating from the Al Jazeera headquarters.

== See also ==
- Ali Hassan al-Jaber
