= Battle of Baghdad (2003) =

Part of the invasion of Iraq

- Part of the invasion of Iraq
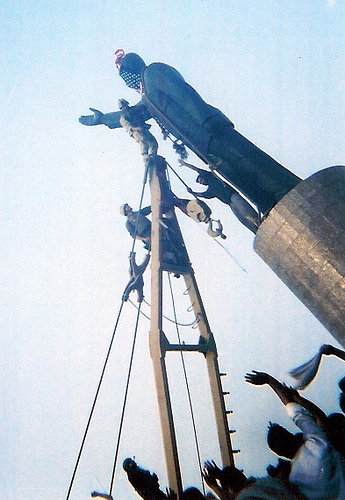
- Statue of Saddam Hussein being toppled in Firdos Square
| Date | April 3–9, 2003 (6 days) |
| Location | Baghdad, Iraq |
| Result | Coalition victory: Occupation of Baghdad by coalition forces; Saddam Hussein deposed; Fall of Ba'ath Party rule; Interim government established in 2004 |

Belligerents
| United States; United Kingdom (Note: Air support) | Iraq |

Commanders and leaders
| George W. Bush; Tommy Franks; David D. McKiernan; Tony Blair; Brian Burridge | Saddam Hussein; Qusay Hussein; Saif Al-Din Al-Rawi; Ra'ad al-Hamdani |

Strength
| 30,000 | 45,000 |

Casualties and losses
| 34 killed 1 A-10 Thunderbolt II shot down 2 Abrams tanks destroyed 17 vehicles destroyed | 1,700–2,120 killed (independent estimate); 2,320 killed (U.S. military estimate) |

The Battle of Baghdad (Arabic: مَعْرَكَةُ بَغْدَاد, romanized: Maʿrakatu baghdād), also known as the Fall of Baghdad (Arabic: سُقُوطُ بَغْدَاد, romanized: suqūṭu baghdād), was a military engagement that took place in Baghdad in early April 2003, as part of the invasion of Iraq.

Three weeks into the invasion of Iraq, Coalition Forces Land Component Command elements, led by the U.S. Army 3rd Infantry Division, captured Baghdad. Over 2,000 Iraqi soldiers as well as 34 coalition troops were killed in the battle. After the fall of Baghdad, Coalition forces entered the city of Kirkuk on April 10 and Tikrit on April 15, 2003. The United States officially declared victory against the Iraqi regime of Saddam Hussein on April 15, and President George W. Bush gave his Mission Accomplished speech on May 1.

Baghdad suffered serious damage to its civilian infrastructure, economy, and cultural inheritance from the battle and following unrest, including looting and arson.

== Preparation ==
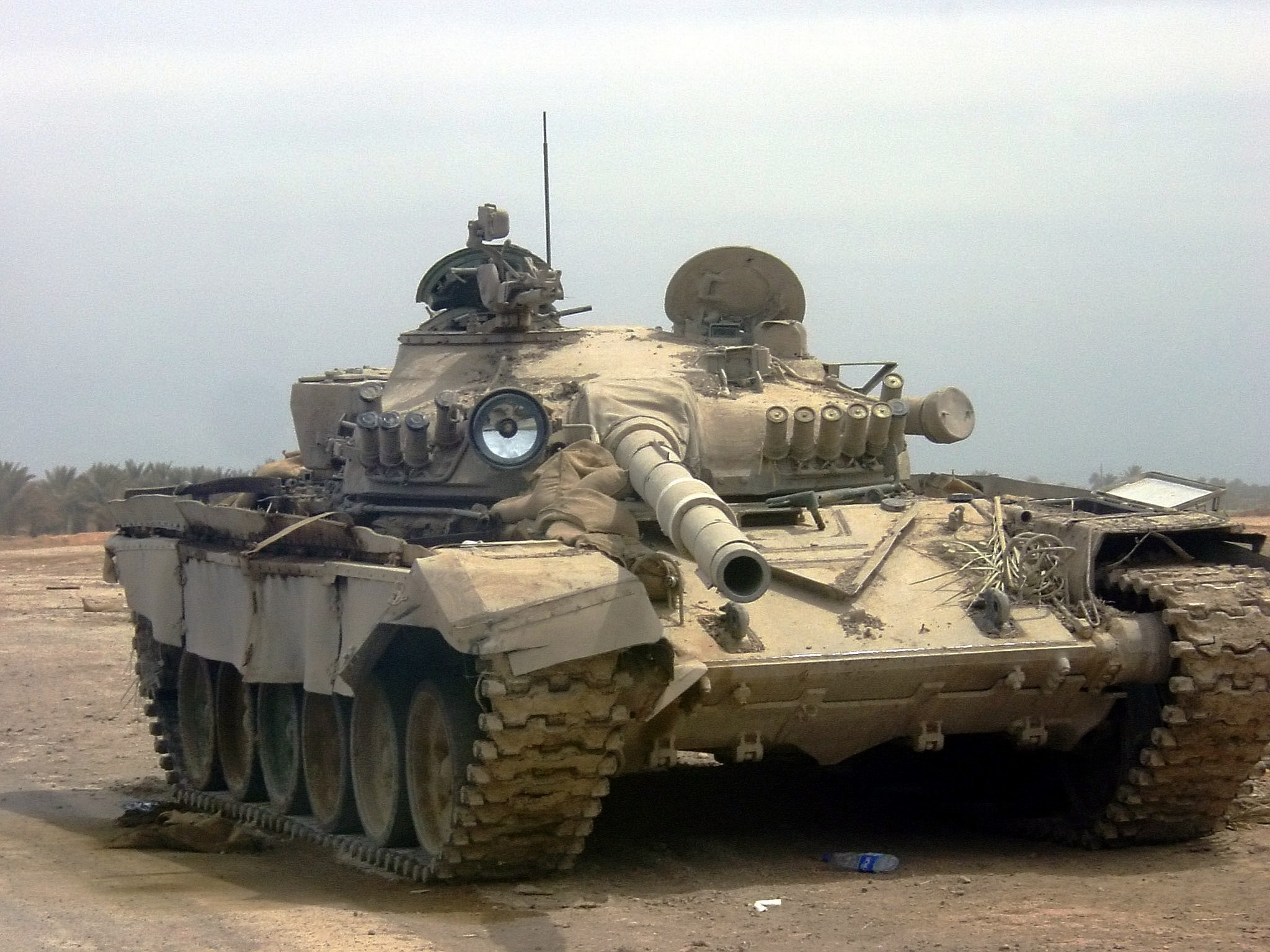
A T-72 Asad Babil (Lion of Babylon) battle tank abandoned after facing the final US attack into Baghdad

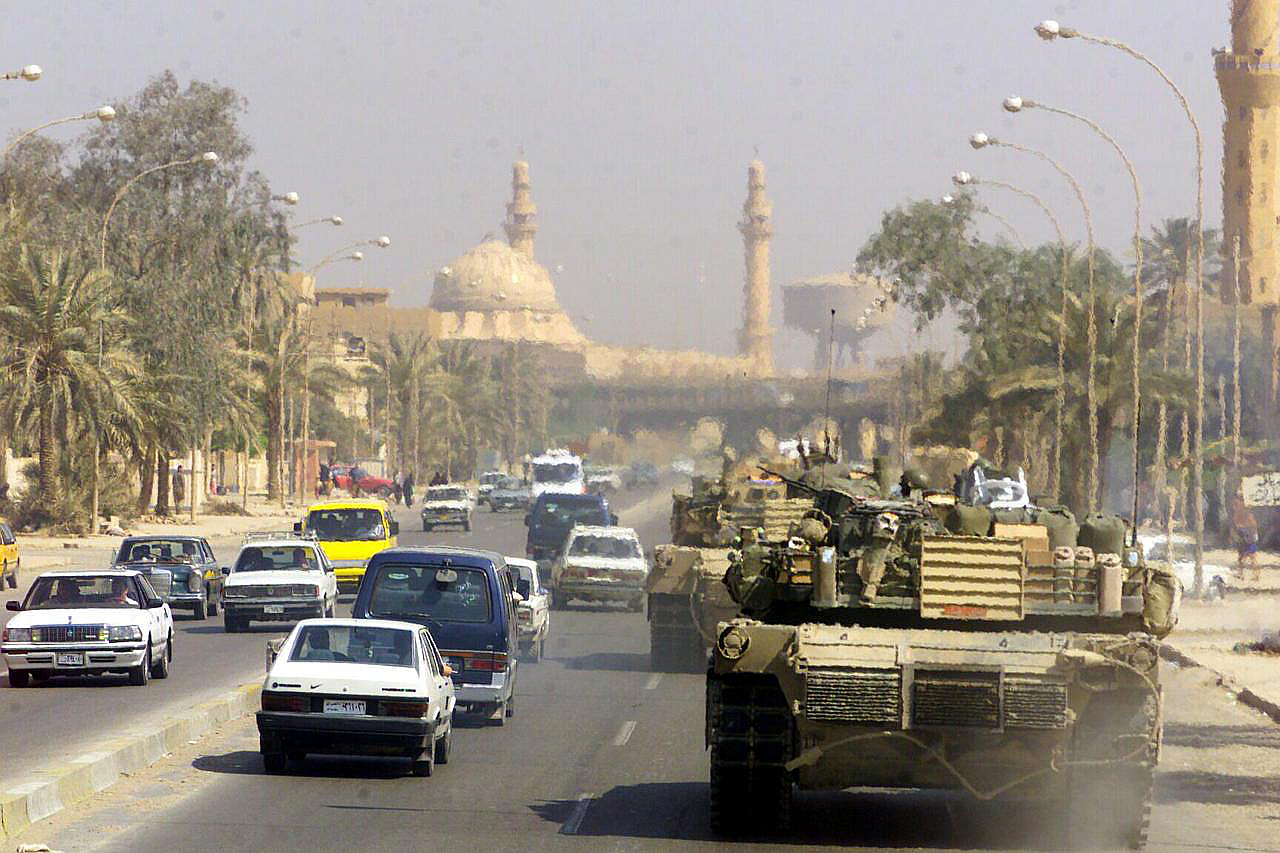
A Marine Corps M1 Abrams tank patrols a Baghdad street after its fall in 2003 during Operation Iraqi Freedom.

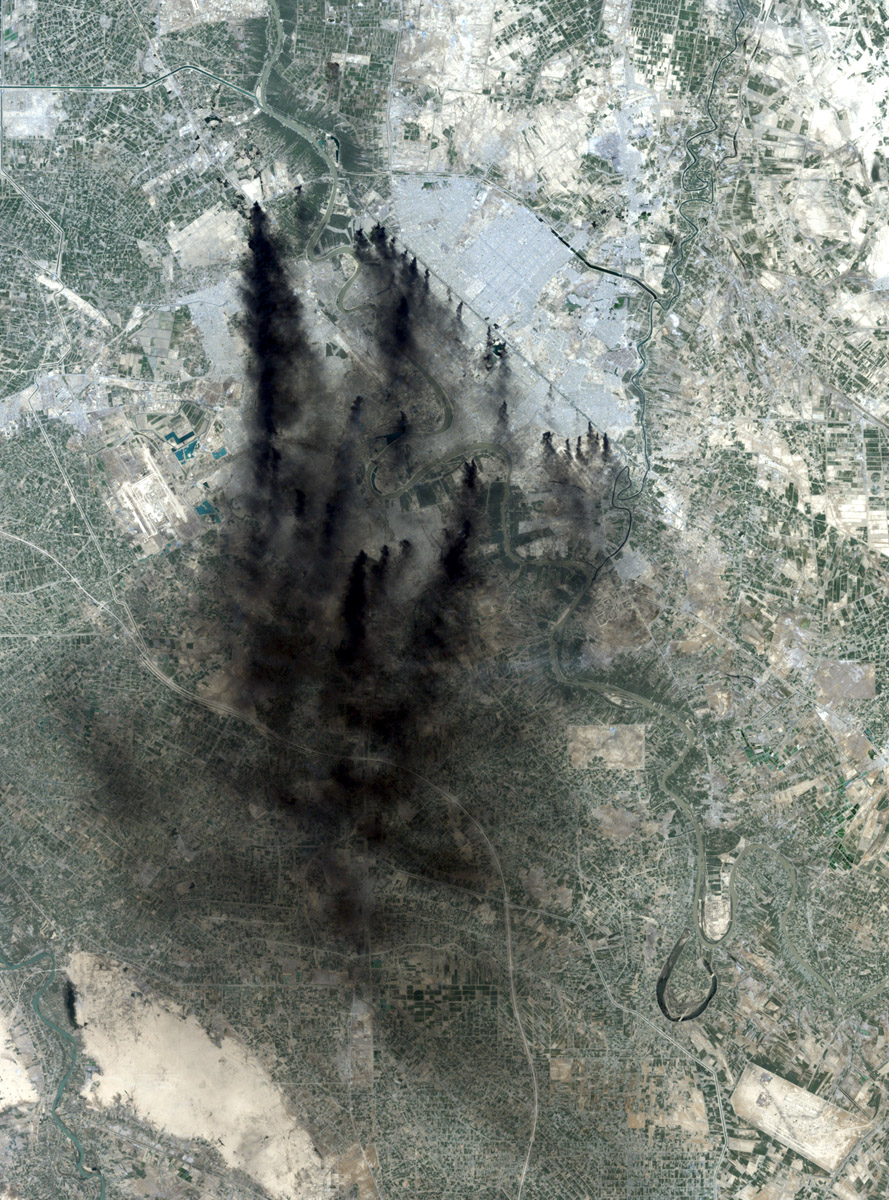
NASA Landsat 7 image of Baghdad, April 2, 2003. The dark streaks are smoke from oil well fires set in an attempt to hinder attacking air forces.

Limited bombing began on March 19, 2003, as United States forces unsuccessfully attempted to kill Saddam Hussein. Attacks continued against a small number of targets until March 21, 2003, when, at 17:00 UTC, the main bombing campaign of the US and their allies began. Its forces launched approximately 1,700 air sorties (504 using cruise missiles). The invasion of the city commenced three days after Allied forces led by Major General Buford Blount and the 3rd Infantry Division had secured the Baghdad airport.

US officials said that their forces fought skirmishes there with the Iraqi Special Republican Guard, with two task forces going up to the Tigris river from the southern outskirts of the city before moving west towards the airport. Major General Victor Renuart said the intention was to indicate to the Iraqi leader that coalition forces could move in and out of Baghdad whenever they wished. The Guardian reported that US forces occupied two "presidential palaces". The Army also surrounded the Information Ministry and other key government installations for a while.

On March 24, retired US Army general Barry McCaffrey, told BBC Newsnight: "If [the Iraqis] actually fight, clearly it's going to be brutal, dangerous work and we could take, bluntly, a couple to 3,000 casualties". In order to avoid the disastrous effects of house to house urban combat, US military planners agreed that seizing western Baghdad (now known as the Green Zone) was one of the main military objectives for securing Baghdad. By seizing only critical nodes and infrastructure in a rapid manner, it was believed such targeted assaults would weaken the regime of Saddam Hussein and hasten its collapse, all the while avoiding the deployment of troops to clear every single block of Baghdad. In preparation for the impending attack, Iraqi military planners organised hybrid groups of paramilitary and regular army units, deployed improvised barriers and destroyed the eastern Diyala River bridges to block US army mechanised units.

=== Forces ===
The invasion of Baghdad was led by the United States Army's 3rd Infantry Division and the United States Marine Corps' 1st Marine Division, equipped with M1 Abrams tanks, M2 Bradley Infantry Fighting Vehicles and M113 armored personnel carriers, LAV-25s, and Assault Amphibious Vehicles. These forces, supported by American and British aircraft including B-52s, Harrier GR7s and A10 Warthogs, confronted 36,000 soldiers of the Iraqi Special Republican Guard protected in sprawling bunkers 30 miles (48 km) outside Baghdad, armed with Asad Babil tanks and heavy artillery.

== Aerial bombing ==
At the time of invasion, coalition aircraft were making bombing runs on Baghdad at the rate of 1,000 sorties a day, most of them aimed at the Republican Guard and Special Republican Guard. U.S. planes also dropped about 200,000 leaflets warning civilians to stay in their homes.

Royal Air Force Tornados from 9 and 617 Squadrons attacked the radar defense systems protecting Baghdad, but lost a Tornado on March 22 along with the pilot and navigator (Flight Lieutenant Kevin Main and Flight Lieutenant Dave Williams) in a friendly fire incident, shot down by an American Patriot missile as they returned to their airbase in Kuwait. On April 2, a US Army Black Hawk helicopter and a United States Navy F/A-18C Hornet were shot down near Karbala. On 8 April, an A-10 Warthog attack plane was shot down in the fighting around Jumhuriya Bridge by an Iraqi surface-to-air missile.

== At Tuwayhah ==
On April 4, 2003, the 2nd Tank Battalion Marine Corps had a stiff fight with the Al Nida Division of the Republican Guards and foreign Islamist fighters on the outskirts of Baghdad. By the end of the day, the Al Nida was considered rendered "combat-ineffective", but three US Marines (1st Lieutenant Brian McPhillips, Sergeant Duane Rios and Corporal Bernard Gooden) were killed in the At Tuwayhah fighting and a tank lost. That day, the 5th Regimental Combat Team reported that two supporting Abrams tanks were destroyed battling the Fedayeen and Al Nida Republican Guards, the latter attempting to use anti-aircraft guns in the ground role.

== Baghdad International Airport ==
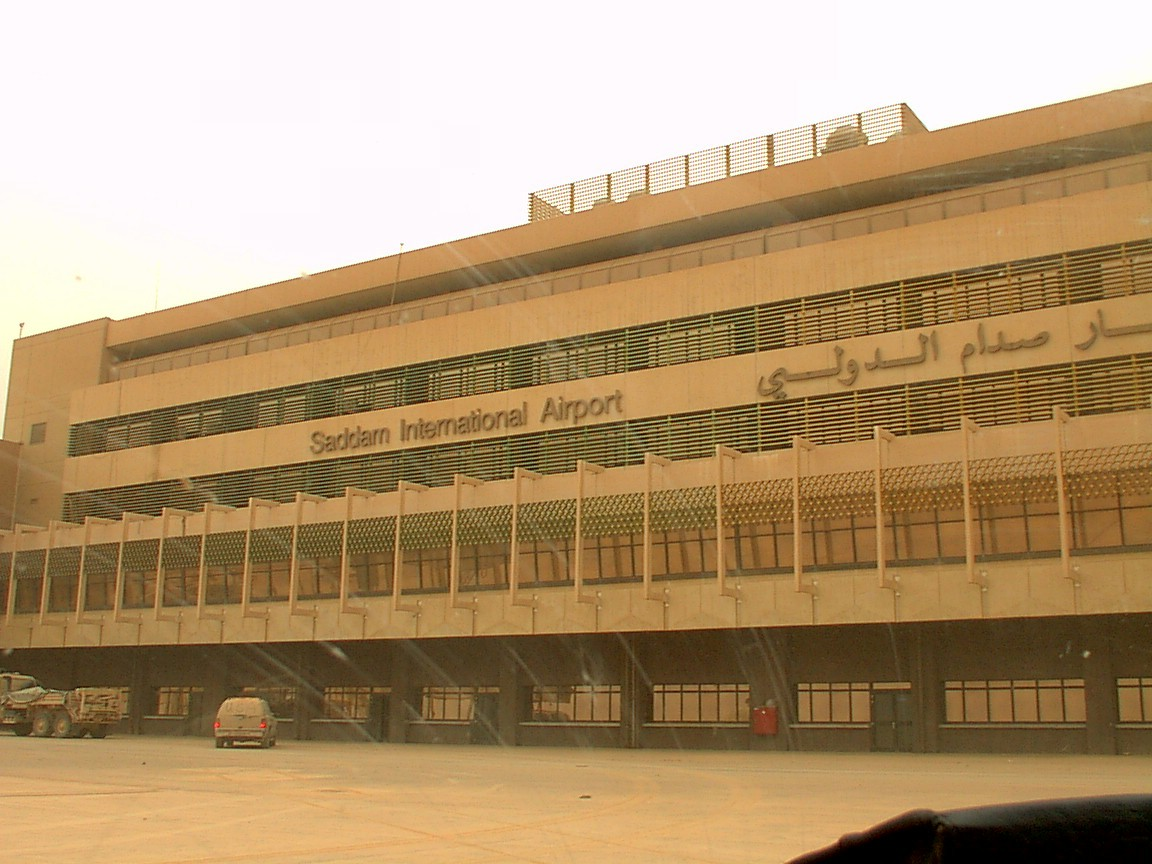
The entrance when the airport was called Saddam International Airport

On the morning of April 3, 2003, US forces advanced on Saddam International Airport. This location turned out to be the best defended Iraqi position of the entire war and two US soldiers were killed by mortar fire early in the fighting. After several hours of combat, the First Brigade, Third Infantry Division succeeded in taking control of Baghdad International Airport, which would become the hub of American logistics in Iraq for the next seven years. Before sunrise on April 4, the Americans were subjected to a fierce counter-attack by Iraqi troops. The First Brigade's Tactical Operations Center (TOC) began receiving small arms and mortar fire. Under the cover of darkness, a number of T-72 tanks managed to get within several hundred meters of their position. According to one source: "It was not until a chemical reconnaissance vehicle was fired on, and a Bradley actually was hit by a T-72 main gun round, that the battalion became aware of its peril."

Fortunately for the crew, the hit was only a glancing one, and they were able to drive their vehicle to safety. A fireteam with a Javelin ATGM destroyed two of the Iraqi tanks, while the rest were destroyed by a passing M1 Abrams. As dawn approached, the attack on the TOC intensified, and Iraqi infantry flooded into the position on foot. During the fighting, Sergeant First Class Paul Ray Smith was killed by enemy fire while fighting off an Iraqi attack on his team in an action that resulted in the posthumous awarding of division's first Medal of Honor since World War II. During the softening up bombardment of Baghdad Airport on April 3, 2003, an Air Force F-15E fighter mistakenly attacked Battery C, 3rd Battalion, 13th Field Artillery (supporting Third Infantry Division), destroying two Humvees and killing Sergeant 1st Class Randy Rehn, Sergeant Todd Robbins and Specialist Donald Oaks. Five other soldiers from the unit were injured in the air attack. On April 4, during operations to secure Baghdad Airport, Sergeant 1st Class Wilbert Davis and American journalist Michael Kelly were killed when the communications Humvee they were riding in came under enemy fire, causing it to swerve off an embankment and fall into a canal.

== Thunder Runs ==
On April 5, Task Force 1–64 Armor of the US Army's 3rd Infantry Division, 2nd Brigade, executed a raid, later called the "Thunder Run", to test remaining Iraqi defenses. The operation began south of Baghdad and went through main roads to the newly secured airport. Iraqi resistance was disorganized, and the unit sustained few casualties. The unit was forced to abandon one tank due to a recoilless rifle or RPG strike in the rear that penetrated a fuel cell and set the engine on fire. The crew was unharmed. Later, the Air Force bombed the tank to destroy it in place, and the Iraqi Information Ministry claimed credit for destroying it.

Two days later, the entire 2nd Brigade of the 3rd Infantry Division was ordered to conduct another "Thunder Run", following the same route as before. This route had been fortified in the intervening period, and senior leaders feared much more substantial resistance than during the prior encounter. Colonel David Perkins, the brigade's commander, followed the original Thunder Run route north into Baghdad, but then veered east into the government districts instead of west towards the airport. The 2nd Brigade easily took control of what is now the "Green Zone" in one day, dramatically speeding up the end of conventional ground combat in Iraq.

This portion of the battle was described in detail in the book Thunder Run: The Armored Strike to Capture Baghdad by David Zucchino, published March 22, 2004.

=== Objectives Moe, Larry, and Curly ===
On April 7, 2003, intense fighting took place at three locations known as objectives Moe, Larry, and Curly (named after the characters in The Three Stooges). Each objective was a cloverleaf where east–west roads intersected with the main north–south route (Highway 8) being used for the Thunder run. Successfully holding these highway interchanges was essential to keep Highway 8 open thus allowing US forces to remain in the city center following the second Thunder run. Objective Moe was at the junction of Highway 8 and the Qadisiyah expressway, Larry at Qatar Al-Nada street leading to the Al Jadriyah bridge, and Curly at the Dora expressway. At the southernmost location, Objective Curly, an 18-hour battle by the 3–15 Infantry resulted in the deaths of two US soldiers (Staff Sergeant Robert Stever and Sergeant 1st Class John Marshall) killed by RPG rounds and about 40 wounded with 350 to 500 Iraqi casualties (Special Republican Guard, Fedayeen and Syrian fighters). US tank (1st and 4th Battalions of the 64th Armored Regiments) and infantry units nearly ran out of fuel and ammunition and were almost overrun until reinforcements broke through and were able to resupply Objective Curly. Toward the end of the fighting, an Ababil-100 SSM missile or an Iraqi FROG-7 rocket exploded among the parked vehicles of the headquarters of 2nd Brigade, 3rd Infantry Division, killing three soldiers (Private 1st Class Anthony Miller, Specialist George A. Mitchell and Sergeant Henry L. Brown) and two embedded journalists (Julio Anguita Parrado and Christian Liebig), wounding 15 others and destroying 17 military vehicles.

== Tharthar Palace ==
US Marines fighting Iraqi army in March 2003

On April 7, US troops took control of a major presidential palace along the Tigris river. It had been hoped that leaders of the regime would be found in the complex, located near Saddam Hussein's home city of Tikrit. American commanders on the ground said that they would remain in the city center rather than return to the outskirts as they had done previously.

Within hours of a palace seizure and with television coverage of this spreading through Iraq, US forces ordered Iraqi forces within Baghdad to surrender, or the city would face a full-scale assault. Iraqi government officials had either disappeared or had conceded defeat.

== Jumhuriya Bridge ==
On April 8, 2003, some 500 Iraqi soldiers, including Republican Guard mounted a fierce counterattack across the Jumhuriya Bridge, forcing part of the US forces on the western side of Baghdad to initially retreat, but the Iraqis reportedly lost 50 soldiers in the fighting that included the use of A-10 Warthogs on the part of the US forces. An A-10 attack plane was shot down in combating the counterattack by an Iraqi surface-to-air missile.

== Looting ==
As the American forces secured control of the capital, Iraqi civilians immediately began plundering the palaces, as well as government offices. At the Yarmuk Hospital, not only all beds, but all medical equipment was stolen. One other hospital managed to continue functioning in a manner by organizing local civilians as armed guards.

Serious looting was described at National Museum of Iraq, and the Saddam Arts Center, the University of Baghdad, three five-star hotels: the Al-Rashid, the Al-Mansour and Babel Hotel, state-owned supermarkets, many embassies, and state-owned factories.

At the National Museum of Iraq, which had been a virtual repository of treasures from the ancient Mesopotamian cultures as well as early Islamic culture, many of the 170,000 irreplaceable artifacts were either stolen or broken (partially found safe and well later). On April 14, the Iraq National Library and National Archives were burned down, destroying thousands of manuscripts from civilizations dating back as far as 7,000 years.

Within eight days following the 2003 invasion, only 35, or 5% of the 700 animals in the Baghdad Zoo survived. This was a result of theft of some animals for human food, and starvation of caged animals that had no food or water. Survivors included larger animals like lions, tigers, and bears. Notwithstanding the chaos brought by the invasion, South African Lawrence Anthony and some of the zoo keepers cared for the animals and fed the carnivores with donkeys they had bought locally. Some of the smaller animals were fed to the larger carnivores by Special Forces (who are trained in veterinarian practices) for humane purposes as all animals had been neglected in the time leading to their arrival and considering the smaller animals were in poor health and stood little chance of survival even with care that was unavailable to them. Sacrifices were made for the lions and other large carnivores to survive until better care could be established.

== Political control ==
As the U.S. forces were occupying the Republican Palace and other central landmarks and ministries on April 9, Saddam Hussein had emerged from his command bunker beneath the Al A'Zamiyah district of northern Baghdad, and greeted excited members of the local public. This impromptu walkabout was probably his last and his reasons for doing so are still unclear. It is possible that he wished to take what he thought might be his last opportunity to greet his people as their country's president. The walkabout was captured on film and broadcast several days after the event on Al-Arabia Television and was also witnessed by ordinary people who corroborated the date afterwards. He was accompanied by bodyguards and other loyal supporters of the regime including at least one of his sons and his personal secretary. After the walkabout, Hussein returned to his bunker and made preparations for his family.

On April 9, 2003, Baghdad was formally occupied by Coalition forces. Much of Baghdad remained unsecured however and fighting continued within the city and its outskirts well into the period of occupation. Saddam, certain members of his family and close subordinates had vanished, and his whereabouts were unknown.

Many Iraqis celebrated the downfall of Saddam by vandalizing the many portraits and statues of him together with other pieces of his legacy. One widely publicized event was the dramatic toppling of a large statue of Saddam in Baghdad's Firdus Square. This attracted considerable media coverage at the time.

=== Firdos Square statue destruction ===
Before a conglomerate of international press (and small crowd of around 100 U.S.-supported Iraqi militia), a 39-foot-tall (12 m) statue of Saddam in Firdus Square was toppled by a U.S. Marine Corps M88 Recovery Vehicle. Initially, a Marine corporal named Edward Chin of the 3rd Battalion, 4th Marines Regiment placed a United States flag on the statue's head, though it was replaced with an Iraqi flag. Various other symbols of the president were defaced.

=== Search for Saddam Hussein ===
The Americans had meanwhile started receiving rumors that Saddam was in Al A'Zamiyah and at dawn on April 10, they dispatched three companies of U.S. Marines to capture him. The Marines fought a fierce four-hour battle with Iraqi government forces at a Baghdad mosque where senior Iraqi leaders had been thought to be holed up, as American warplanes attacked areas of the city under the control of the Iraqi military. "We had information that a group of regime leadership was attempting to organize a meeting. The fighting in and around the mosque complex could not be avoided as enemy forces were firing from the area of the mosque." said Navy captain Frank Thorp. Marines came under fire from rocket-propelled grenades, mortars and assault rifles. One Marine was killed and more than 20 were wounded, but neither Saddam nor any of his aides were found.

== Reporting ==
Prior to the invasion, the US policy was that journalists reporting from the ground should be "embedded", that is, be stationed within military units. Such reporters were required to sign contracts with the military and agree to rules that restricted what they could report on. Journalists found breaking those rules risked losing their embedded accreditation and being expelled from Iraq.

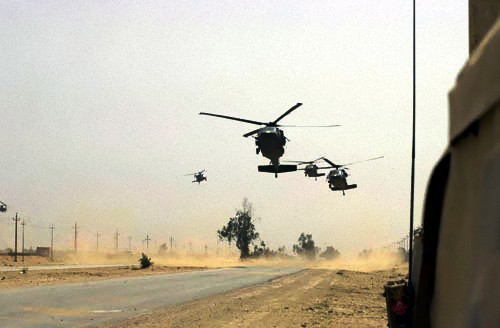
Black Hawk helicopters from 5th Battalion, 101st Combat Aviation Brigade, 101st Airborne Division (Air Assault) move into an Iraqi city during an operation to occupy the city, April 5.

Iraq initially issued a statement contradicting western reporters' accounts of the invasion. Muhammed Saeed al-Sahaf, head of the Information Ministry, told a press conference on April 7 that there were no U.S. troops in Baghdad, saying: "Their infidels are committing suicide by the hundreds on the gates of Baghdad. Be assured, Baghdad is safe, protected. Iraqis are heroes."

On April 8, two American air-to-surface missiles hit Al Jazeera's office in a residential area of Baghdad killing a reporter and wounding a cameraman. The nearby office of Arab satellite channel Abu Dhabi TV was also hit by air strikes. Al Jazeera and Abu Dhabi TV were the only international media organizations to continue operating from their headquarters in Baghdad. Since the war started, other international media organizations had moved their operations to the Palestine Hotel in Baghdad. On the same day a U.S. Army tank fired into the 15th floor of the Palestine Hotel, killing two cameramen and wounding three. These attacks prompted accusations that the US was deliberately targeting news media outlets. Al Jazeera had provided the Pentagon with co-ordinates of its office in Baghdad; the Abu Dhabi TV building was clearly identified by a large blue sign on its roof, and, for the Palestine Hotel, according to Geert Linnebank, Reuters editor-in-chief, "US troops who have known all along that this hotel is the main base for almost all foreign journalists in Baghdad". In the Abu Dhabi case, the station aired the picture of Iraqi fire from beneath the camera. In the hotel case, however, other journalists on the scene stated that there was no fire from or around the hotel.
