= Ricardo Ortega Fernández =

Spanish journalist (1966–2004)

Ricardo Ortega
- Born: Ricardo Ortega Fernández; April 4, 1966; Cuenca, Spain
- Died: March 7, 2004 (aged 37); Port-au-Prince, Haiti
- Cause of death: Gunshot wound to chest
- Education: Bachelors of Science in Engineering
- Alma mater: University of Valencia
- Occupation: Journalist
- Years active: 1990s-2004
- Employer: Antena 3 (Spain)
- Organization: EFE Agency
- Known for: Journalist for Antena 3
- Parents: José Luis Ortega (father); Charo Fernández (mother)

Ricardo Ortega Fernández (April 4, 1966 – March 7, 2004) was a Spanish journalist for the television channel Antena 3, who was shot and killed while on assignment in Port-au-Prince, Haiti to cover the protests in the aftermath of the 2004 Haitian coup d'état.

== Personal ==
Ricardo Ortega Fernandez was born to parents Charo Fernández and José Luis Ortega in Cuenca, Castilla-La Mancha, Province of Cuenca, Spain in 1966. As a 7-year old, he moved with his family to Alicante, Valencian Community, along the coast known as Costa Blanca, Province of Alicante. His studies were at the Primary School in Cervantes and Montgó, as well as the Historiador Chabás in Dénia. At the University of Valencia, Ortega Fernandez earned a bachelor's degree in engineering, and then went to Russia to pursue studies in nuclear physics. It was while studying in Russia that Ortega was asked by EFE to report and he turned to a career in journalism. After his death, he was declared by the city of Dénia as its "Adopted Son."

== Career ==
Ricardo Ortega started his journalism career in the early 1990s working for the Spanish newswire agency EFE in Moscow, Russia, where he remained for eight years. As a foreign correspondent for EFE, he reported from such places as Sarajevo and Chechnya. After moving to Antena 3 in 2000, he reported from New York City, Afghanistan, Iraq, and Washington. His interview with General Ahmad Shah Massoud is well known. He was on a leave in New York City from Antena 3, when they offered that he cover the Haitian crisis after the coup d'état.

== Death ==
He was killed in Port-au-Prince, Haiti.

In late February, President Jean-Bertrand Aristide was removed from Haiti by the US Military. On March 7, 2004, Ortega had been on assignment in Port-au-Prince, Haiti, covering street protests for his tenth day when violence erupted around 2 p.m. It was reported that the initial shots came from anti-Aristide protester but that shots were returned from the other direction. In the crossfire, US photojournalist Michael Laughlin, Sun-Sentinel of Florida, was wounded. There were two accounts of Ortega's killing. According to US journalist Peter Andrew Bosh of the Miami Herald, Ortega had been in a house, located at Rue Lamarre 41-43, and providing aid with others to his wounded colleague, and when he stepped out of the house, he was shot twice. However, German photojournalist Marcel Mettelsiefen said Ortega was in a courtyard when he was shot from above. He could have been shot by either anti-Aristide protesters or by US Marines, although a Marine spokesperson disputed this assertion at the time. He took two bullets, one to the chest and one to the abdomen, in the accounts. The group was pinned down by gunfire and had to leave Ortega and others wounded unattended for several minutes. Witnesses say that one of bullets that hit Ortega in either the chest or abdomen also hit a Haitian citizen Joseph Franois. His interpreter was also killed.

Ortega Ferndandez died while being treated at the Hôpital du Canapé Vert. His last words before arriving at the hospital were documented as being "I can't breathe." A doctor told reporters that he was among the 5 or 6 killed along with 20 other people who had been injured by a "high velocity" weapon.

Weeks afterwards, a supporter of Aristide and a police inspector were arrested and investigated for their involvement in the crisis. Both have been released since and not charged. According to journalist and film maker Kevin Pina, the former chief of the police station known as La Ville, police inspector Jean-Michel Gaspard, was arrested but released shortly after his lawyer demanded the US Embassy reveal the identity of a suspected "gunman" US Marines said fired on them and they admitted killing on March 7, 2004.

== Context ==
Already in 2004, witnesses claimed that the rounds that killed Ortega were shot by US Marines and not by pro-Aristide supporters. Ortega-Fernandez's parents Jose Luis Ortega and Charo Fernandez called for the investigation of their son's death as well as international attention to further investigation. In April 2007, Spanish authorities called on Haiti to create a commission to look more into the case but no commission has been formed. In 2008, a Haitian Judge Bernard Saint-Vil determined that the shots fired on Ortega most likely originated from the foreign soldiers. Spanish Judge Pablo Ruz, representing the Central Criminal Court, reopened the case on June 24, 2008. The criminal court has jurisdiction over violent cases of Spanish citizens that occur in a foreign country.

== Impact ==
After Ricardo Ortega was killed in Port-au-Prince, Haitian journalists experienced more violence as pro- and anti-Aristide positions hardened. In Haiti, Abdias Jean, Robenson Laraque, and Jacques Roche were among those killed.

== Reactions ==
Koïchiro Matsuura, director-general of UNESCO, said, "I deplore the death of Ricardo Ortega, one of at least six people who appear to have been killed in indiscriminate shooting, It is essential that journalists be able to carry out their work in conditions of reasonable safety...and I urge the authorities to seek and prosecute the perpetrators of these attacks in which dozens are reported to have been wounded..."

As his body arrived in Madrid, the employees of Antena 3 paid homage to Ortega-Fernandez and the work he had accomplished on various assignments including support for and coverage of the 9/11 attacks in New York City in 2001.

== Awards ==
- The United Nations Correspondents Association created a journalism prize in Ortega's memory which is presented with a US$10,000.
- He received the Medalla al Mérito en el Trabajo, just like José Couso Permuy, Julio Anguita Parrado, Julio Fuentes, Jordi Pujol i Puente and Juan Antonio Rodríguez Moreno.

== See also ==
- Assassinations of Little Haiti journalists (United States)
- Brignol Lindor
- Jean Dominique
