= Stéphanie Fillion =

French-Canadian journalist

Stéphanie Fillion (born 23 March 1992) is a French-Canadian journalist specializing in human rights and international affairs. Fillion has covered the United Nations and women in politics.

== Early life ==
Fillion was born in Chicoutimi, Canada, in a French-speaking family. She knew from an early age that she wanted to be a journalist and cover international politics. She studied broadcast journalism at the Cégep de Jonquière, and holds a bachelor's degree in political science, history and Italian study from McGill University and a master's degree from Columbia Journalism School. She speaks French, English, and Italian.

== Career ==
Fillion started her journalism career in Vancouver, Canada in 2012 as a sports and weather reporter for the Canadian Broadcasting Corporation and eventually became a breaking news reporter covering current affairs. In 2015, she won the EU-Canada Young Journalist award for her story on Abraham Ulrikab and ethnographic shows. She moved to New York City in 2016 to pursue a master's degree at Columbia University.

In 2017, Fillion worked as a fellow at the Italian newspaper La Stampa on the foreign affairs desk.

In 2021, she was awarded the Prince Albert II of Monaco & UNCA Global Prize for her reporting that dealt with ways in which the Security Council addressed the issue of climate change. In 2022, she won the Gracies Award for individual achievement in a foreign language for her coverage of the 2021 United Nations Secretary-General selection process and persistent coverage of women in the race. In 2022, she won the Elizabeth Neuffer Memorial Prize for her coverage of pandemic preparedness at the United Nations. Her reporting showed how WHO selected Berlin for geopolitical and financial reasons and how the organization struggled from the onset of the deadly COVID-19 virus in early 2020.
