= United Nations Correspondents Association =

Journalism association based in New York City

The United Nations Correspondents Association (U.N. Correspondents Association), or UNCA, was founded in New York City in 1948. It has over 250 members today . It presents the annual UNCA Excellence in Journalism Awards. The purpose of the awards "is to recognize and encourage excellence in reporting on the United Nations, its affiliated agencies, organizations and missions."

The 2013 Awards were reported in The New York Times:

== Executive board ==
U.N. Correspondents Association 2025 Executive Board

President: Valeria Robecco, ANSA News Agency

1st Vice President: Edith Lederer, Associated Press

2nd Vice President: Betul Yuruk, CNBC Turkiye

3rd Vice President: Carrie Nooten, Le Monde

Treasurer: Giampaolo Pioli, Quotidiano Nazionale

Secretary: Linda Fasulo, National Public Radio

Members at Large:

Ali Barada, France 24; Aaron Berger, SABC News; Amelie Bottollier-Depois, Agence France Presse; Sherwin Bryce-Pease, SABC News; Stéphanie Fillion, Asahi Shimbun; Yvonne Murray, RTÉ; Benno Schwinghammer, DPA, German Press Agency; Xu Dezhi, China Central Television; Sylvianne Zehil, L'Orient Le Jour

== Excellence in Journalism Awards ==
The UNCA Excellence in Journalism Awards are presented by the United Nations Correspondents Association. They include:

=== The Elizabeth Neuffer Memorial Prize ===
See footnote.

The Elizabeth Neuffer Memorial Prize was established in memory of a journalist for The Boston Globe, who was killed while reporting the war in Iraq in 2003. The prize is for written media (including online media).

=== The Ricardo Ortega Memorial Prize ===
See footnote.

- The Ricardo Ortega Memorial Prize was established in honor of a Spanish reporter, who was killed while covering events in Haiti in 2004. The prize is for broadcast (TV & Radio) media.

=== The Prince Albert II of Monaco and UNCA Global Prize ===
See footnote.

The prize is for coverage of climate change.

=== The United Nations Foundation Prize ===
See footnote.

- The United Nations Foundation Prize is for print (including online media) and broadcast media (TV & Radio) for coverage of humanitarian and development aspects of the U.N. and U.N. agencies. The prize is sponsored by the UN Foundation.
