= Laymon Ramsey =

American baseball player

- Pitcher
- Born: August 24, 1917; Grady, Alabama, U.S.
- Died: April 7, 2003 (aged 85); Birmingham, Alabama, U.S.

Negro league baseball debut
- 1947, for the Memphis Red Sox

Last appearance
- 1947, for the Memphis Red Sox

Teams
- Memphis Red Sox (1947)

Laymon Ramsey (August 24, 1917 – April 7, 2003) was an American Negro league pitcher in the 1940s.

A native of Grady, Alabama, Ramsey served in the US Marines during World War II. He played for the Memphis Red Sox in 1947, posting a 1.29 ERA over 14 innings in two recorded games for the Red Sox. Ramsey died in Birmingham, Alabama in 2003 at age 85.
