= Palestine Hotel =

Hotel in Baghdad, Iraq

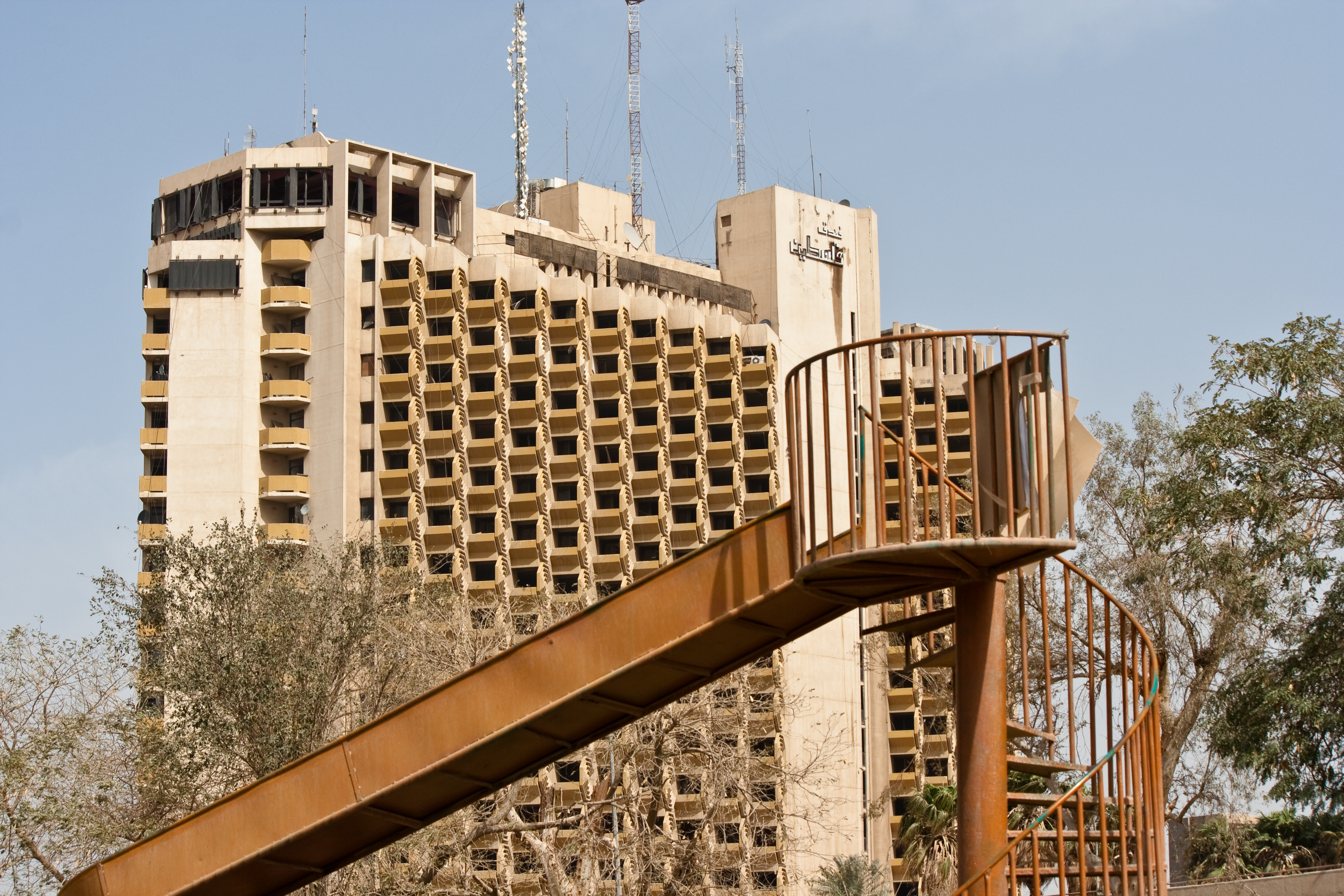
- Palestine Hotel, 2010
- Interactive map of the Palestine Hotel area

General information
- Location: Firdos Square, Baghdad, Iraq
- Coordinates: 33°18′55″N 44°25′07″E
- Year built: 1982
- Completed: 1982
- Opened: 1982

Technical details
- Floor count: 16

The Palestine Hotel (Arabic: فندق فلسطين), often referred to simply as The Palestine, is a 16-story luxury hotel in Baghdad, Iraq. Located on the Firdos Square near from Saadon, across from the Ishtar Hotel, the hotel overlooks the Tigris on its eastern bank and is located several hundred metres south of the Baghdad Hotel. It has long been favoured by journalists and media personnel.

== History ==
The hotel was built in 1982 by the Iraqi government and managed by the French hotelier Meridien Hotels as the Palestine Meridien Hotel. It was supposedly built for a large international arms fair in Baghdad, organized by Saddam Hussein.

UN-imposed sanctions following the Gulf War led Le Méridien to dissociate itself from the hotel, which was subsequently renamed simply the Palestine Hotel. Starting with the 1991 Gulf War and continuing through the 2003 invasion of Iraq, this was one of several hotels foreign media used to cover situations that developed in Iraq, and it survived explosive attacks by various parties.

=== April 8th, 2003 incident ===
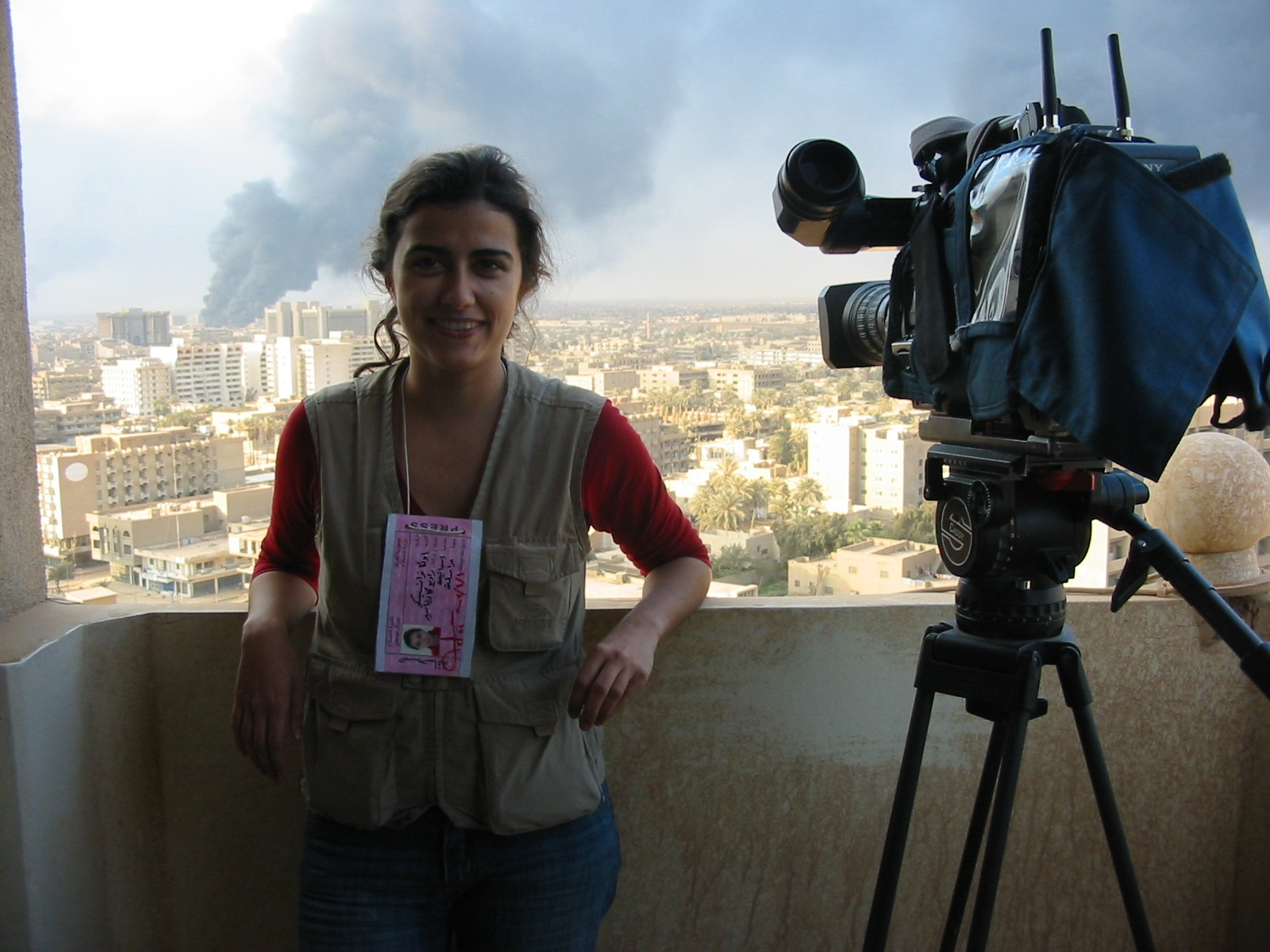
Spanish journalist Olga Rodriguez on the balcony of a room at the hotel, 2003

A controversial incident occurred during the 2003 invasion of Baghdad. On April 8, 2003, an American tank fired a shell on the hotel, killing two journalists, Reuters cameraman Taras Protsyuk and José Couso of Telecinco Spanish television. Three journalists were wounded. One of the survivor journalists was Japanese Mika Yamamoto who died in Aleppo during the Syrian civil war on August 20, 2012.

On May 27, 2003, the Committee to Protect Journalists (CPJ) published a report of their investigation into the tank shelling of the Palestine Hotel on April 8, 2003.

After interviewing "about a dozen reporters who were at the scene, including two embedded journalists who monitored the military radio traffic before and after the shelling occurred" the CPJ determined that the facts suggest that the "attack on the journalists, while not deliberate, was avoidable". The CPJ determined that the tank thought it was firing upon an Iraqi forward artillery observer when it hit the hotel. The report went on to say "CPJ has learned that Pentagon officials, as well as commanders on the ground in Baghdad, knew that the Palestine Hotel was full of international journalists and were intent on not hitting it."

A U.S. military investigation in August 2003 cleared Philip DeCamp and the other two soldiers concerned, Sgt. Shawn Gibson and Capt. Philip Wolford, of wrongdoing, saying they acted properly because they believed they were firing on enemy troops. According to the inquiry, American commanders reacted to the tank's firing on the building immediately with anger and consternation, with Lieutenant Colonel DeCamp, the battalion commander, berating Captain Wolford, his subordinate, for giving Sergeant Gibson clearance to fire. However the inquiry never clarified why he or anybody else were unable to prevent the attack from taking place.

A few days after the April incident, DeCamp was quoted in the Los Angeles Times as saying "I'm sorry to say it, but I'm the guy who killed the journalists. I'm really sorry, and I feel badly for their families, but I had no choice. My soldiers' lives were in danger."

In February 2004, the NGO Reporters Without Borders, after undertaking their own investigation, called for the reopening of the inquiry into the incident of 8 April 2003. The NGO stated that the soldiers on the ground, including Philip Wolford, Philip DeCamp and Shawn Gibson, could probably not be held responsible for their lack of information about the function of the Palestine Hotel. Reporters Without Borders, however, demanded that the responsibility of higher commanding levels be investigated, as they withheld the crucial information from their lower ranking officers that the Palestine Hotel was used by journalists.

On Monday, October 24th 2005 at 5:25pm, a coordinated attack from 5 to 10 insurgents was launched against Hotel Palestine. A car bomb initially blew a hole in the hotel's safety barricade. A truck then drone in through the breached barricade. Spc. Darrell Green, of the Army Infantry, stopped the truck by shooting the driver. Seconds later, a private security firm stopped the third car bomb. On the opposite side of Hotel Palestine, insurgents shot rockets, rocket propelled grenades and machine guns at the building. 16 people, including security guards, hotel staff, and passersby, were killed in the attack. After the attack, Iraqi Security Forces and Coalition Forces secured the area. They worked until the barricade was up. Journalist Reena Ninan was staying at the hotel and went live at the hotel on Fox News three minutes after the blast. The wall was missing from her hotel room as a result of the blasts. Ninan went unharmed. This was Ninan's first day on the job covering the Middle East.

In 2008, former military intelligence linguist Army Sergeant Adrienne Kinne revealed to Democracy Now! that she had seen secret US military documents that listed the Hotel Palestine as a potential target. However, Kinne dodged attempts by investigators to be interviewed. A Spanish judge has indicted three US soldiers in 2009 in the killings: Sergeant Shawn Gibson, Captain Philip Wolford and Lieutenant Colonel Philip DeCamp. The three men were charged with homicide and committing a crime against the international community.

=== Post war ===
Being a soft, highly visible target, the hotel periodically came under attack during the Iraqi insurgency.

== Gallery ==
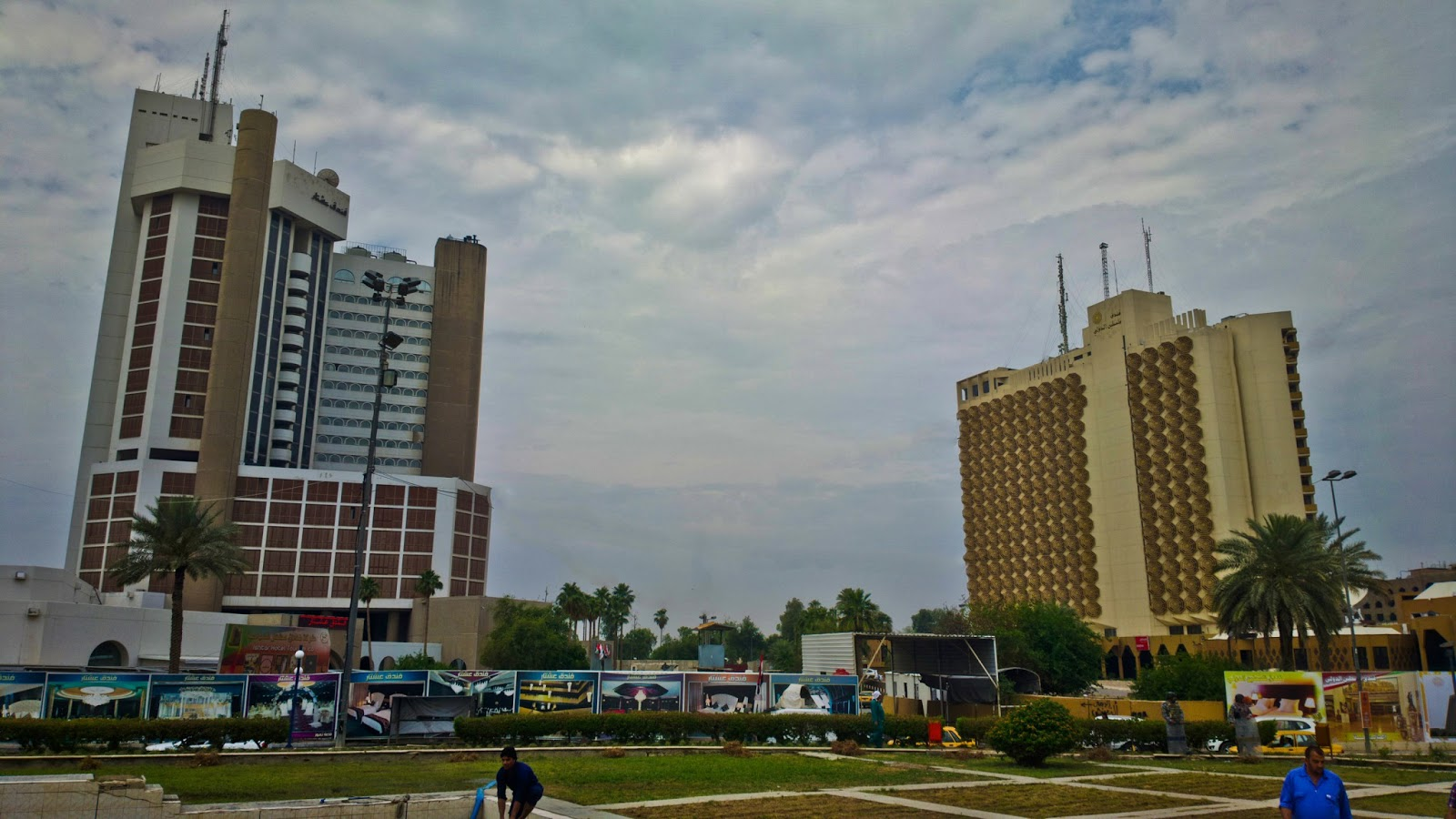
Palestine Hotel on right, Cristal Grand Ishtar Hotel on left

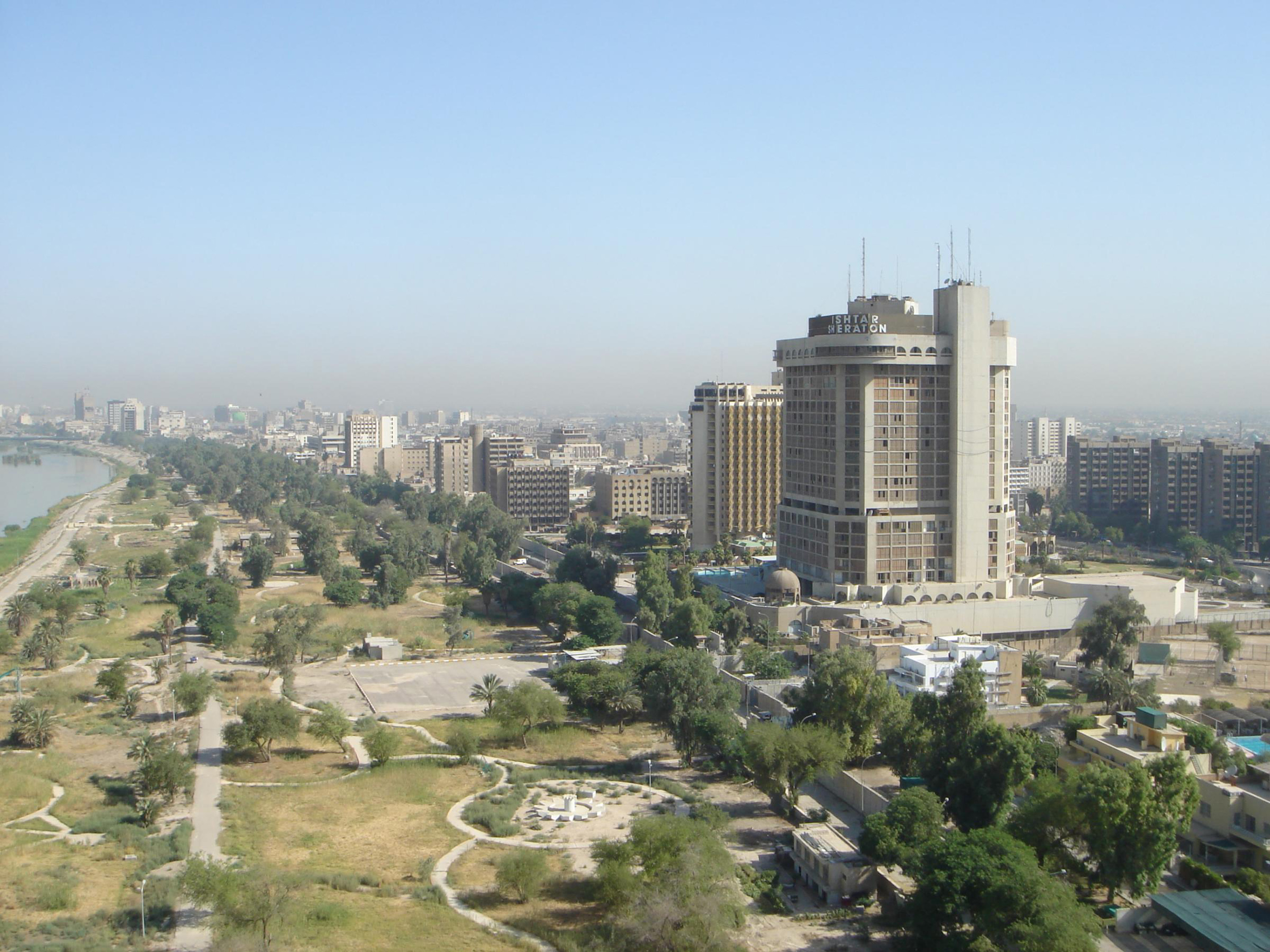
Palestine Hotel and Ishtar Hotel, along with Baghdad Corniche and Abu Nawas Street

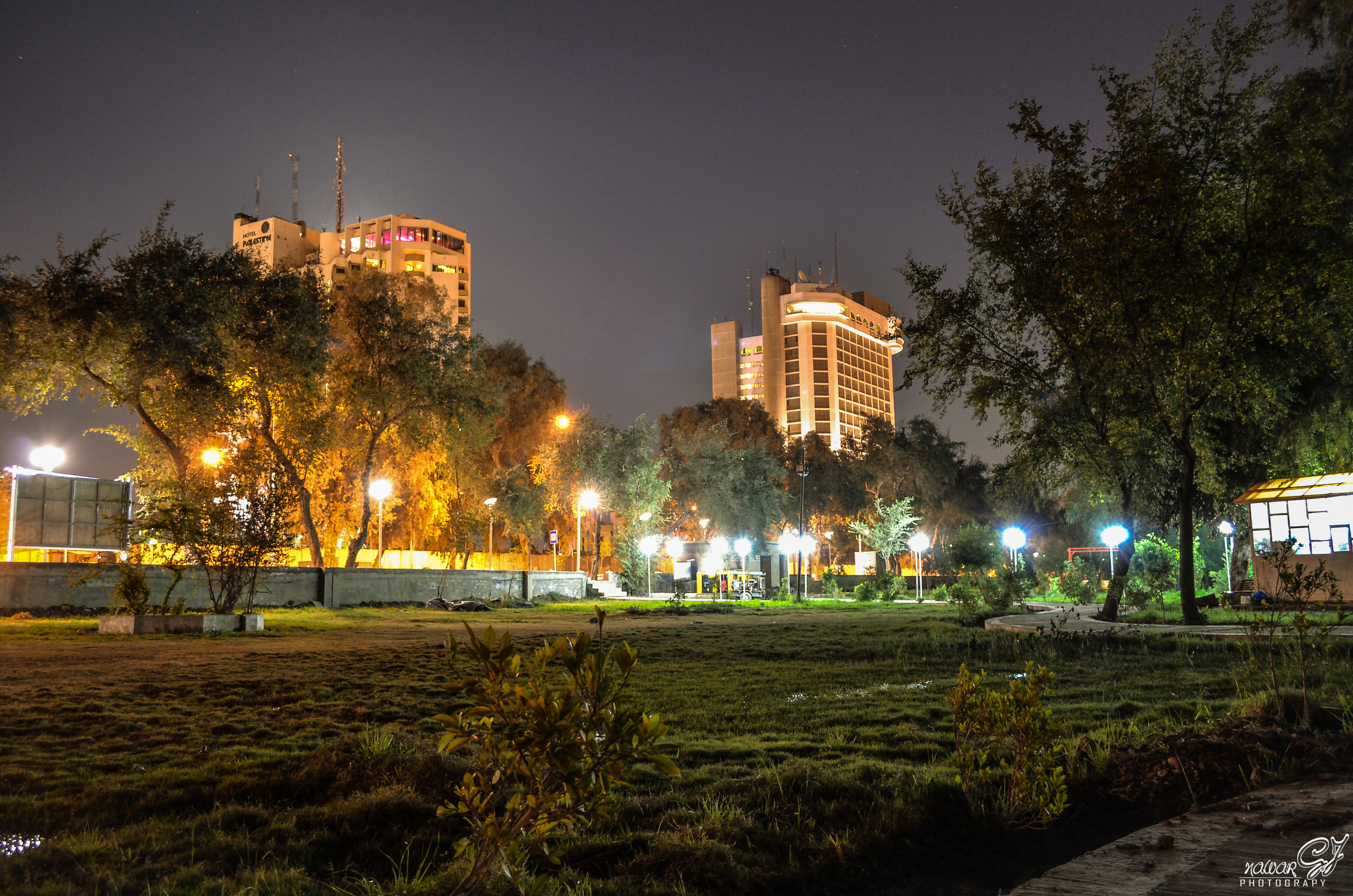
Palestine Hotel and Ishtar Hotel from Baghdad Corniche

== See also ==
- Al Rasheed Hotel
- Baghdad Hotel
- Ishtar Hotel
