= Taras Protsyuk =

Ukrainian journalist (1968–2003)

Taras Protsyuk Тарас Процюк
- Born: January 16, 1968; Ivano-Frankivsk, Ukrainian SSR
- Died: April 8, 2003 (aged 35); Baghdad, Iraq
- Occupation: TV cameraman

Taras Protsyuk (Ukrainian: Тарас Процюк; January 16, 1968 – April 8, 2003) was a Ukrainian TV cameraman working for Reuters, who was killed by a U.S. Army tank shell during the 2003 U.S.-led invasion of Iraq.

== Biography ==
Born in Ivano-Frankivsk (Ukraine), Protsyuk was based and lived in Warsaw (Poland) since 1999 and worked as a cameraman for Reuters since 1993. During his career he covered the conflicts in Afghanistan, Bosnia, Chechnya, Kosovo and made news reports about Poland. Protsyuk was in line to gain Polish citizenship. Protsyuk is survived by his wife and an eight-year-old son, the family had moved from Kyiv to Warsaw in 1999.

=== Death ===
Protsyuk died on April 8, 2003 (April 8, 2003 journalist deaths by U.S. fire). Protsyuk was filming from a balcony of the Palestine Hotel in Baghdad, where most of the foreign journalists were staying, when a shell fired by a U.S. M1 Abrams tank killed him and José Couso, a cameraman for the Spanish television station Telecinco. The U.S. soldier commanding the tank was Sgt. Shawn Gibson of the U.S. 3rd Infantry Division. On the same day, a total of three locations in Baghdad housing journalists were targeted and fired upon by U.S. armed forces, killing three journalists and wounding four.

There were conflicting reports about the nature of the shelling that killed Protsyuk. In the immediate aftermath of the incident, U.S. military officials claimed one of their tanks had fired on the hotel in response to incoming sniper and rocket fire. However, journalists in the hotel at the time of the shelling, claimed to have heard no fire coming from the hotel. Moreover, the supposedly 'accidental' nature of the incident was subject to further questioning when a former military intelligence official revealed in 2008 that the Palestine Hotel had been listed as a military target prior to the 2003 incident.

== Remembrance ==
Hundreds, including politicians and public figures, attended his funeral in Kyiv on April 13, and the Ukrainian parliament observed a minute of silence in his memory.

On April 8 the United States Embassy in Kyiv is annually picketed in his memory.
