= April 2003 journalist killings by the United States =

On April 8, 2003, three locations in Baghdad housing journalists were fired upon by U.S. armed forces during 2003 invasion of Iraq, killing three journalists and wounding four.

== Al Jazeera's office ==
Two American air-to-surface missiles hit the Qatar satellite TV station at Al Jazeera's office in Baghdad and killed Tareq Ayyoub, a Palestinian reporter, and wounded Zouhair al-Iraqi, an Iraqi cameraman. They were live broadcasting on the roof of the building. Al Jazeera accused the U.S. of intentionally targeting Al Jazeera as the U.S. bombed its Kabul bureau in 2001 during the U.S. invasion of Afghanistan.

== Palestine Hotel ==
A U.S. Army tank fired into the 15th floor of the Palestine Hotel in Baghdad, where almost all foreign journalists were based. The image of the hotel had been frequently broadcast in the news, since many journalists filmed their reports nearby. The tank fire killed the Reuters cameraman Taras Protsyuk and wounded three. José Couso of Telecinco Spanish television who was on the 14th floor also died.

At the time, Company A of the 4th Battalion, 64th Armored Regiment was holding the west end of the al-Jumhuria Bridge. The U.S. Forces were under attack from Iraqi units on both sides of the Tigris River, including mortar fire. Earlier that morning, the battalion had captured an Iraqi two-way radio, over which they heard an Iraqi forward observer directing mortar fire against Company A. This information was relayed to the forces at the bridge, who began looking for the enemy spotter. An A-Company tank spotted an individual on a balcony on the upper floor of a high-rise building to the southeast who appeared to be observing the company with "some kind of optics" (likely Protsyuk). Assuming this was the enemy spotter, the tank commander asked for and received permission to fire. The tank fired a high-explosive anti-tank (HEAT) round at the balcony, killing Protsyuk and Couso. Before the incident, no one in the 4-64 had been briefed about the Palestine Hotel or its location, since the hotel was not in their sector (the east bank of the Tigris was allocated to the 1st Marine Division). U.S. forces later determined that the Iraqi artillery spotter was probably in a nearby building, not the hotel.

In 2008, whistleblower Sgt. Adrienne Kinne, a former Arabic linguist in U.S. Army Intelligence, reported that she had seen secret documents listing the Palestine Hotel as a possible military target before the 2003 shelling incident in which it was targeted.

== Abu Dhabi's office ==
The office of the United Arab Emirates satellite channel Abu Dhabi was hit by air strikes. The station aired the picture of Iraqi fire from beneath the camera.

== Responses to the three in general ==
Pentagon

During a briefing from The Pentagon on April 8, a reporter asked "(...) There are reports that a tank took small arms and perhaps R.P.G. fire from the direction of the hotel, although journalists say that they saw no sign of it. Do you think that's reason enough for a tank to fire a round at the hotel where you know there are unarmed journalists?"

Major General Stanley McChrystal answered "(...) particularly with this war, journalists have been closer to coalition soldiers than probably ever before with the embedded program, and those who are not. (...) When [forces] get into combat in the cities, which, from the beginning, we had specifically said would be dangerous and difficult, you put yourself in their position, they had the inherent right of self-defense. When they are fired at, they have not only the right to respond, they have the obligation to respond to protect the soldiers with them and to accomplish the mission at large (...)."

U.S. Central Command

At a briefing in Doha, Qatar, Brigadier General Vincent K. Brooks said of the Al Jazeera attack, "This coalition does not target journalists. We don't know every place journalists are operating on the battlefield. It's a dangerous place indeed."

Governments

On March 8, Spanish and Portuguese governments insisted that all the journalists of the countries evacuate from Baghdad.

Journalist and civil organizations

Committee to Protect Journalists sent a letter to Defense Secretary Donald Rumsfeld to demand investigation. Reporters Without Borders demanded proof from Donald Rumsfeld that the incidents "were not deliberate attempts to dissuade the media from reporting." Amnesty International demanded independent investigation.

== Report of Committee to Protect Journalists ==
On May 27, 2003, the Committee to Protect Journalists (CPJ) published a report of their investigation into the tank shelling of the Palestine Hotel on April 8, 2003. After interviewing "about a dozen reporters who were at the scene, including two embedded journalists who monitored the military radio traffic before and after the shelling occurred" the CPJ determined that the facts suggest that the "attack on the journalists, while not deliberate, was avoidable". The CPJ determined that the tank's intended target was an Iraqi forward artillery observer when it hit the hotel. The report went on to say "CPJ has learned that Pentagon officials, as well as commanders on the ground in Baghdad, knew that the Palestine Hotel was full of international journalists and were intent on not hitting it."

== See also ==
- Media coverage of the Iraq War

== Sources ==
- At Least 3 Journalists Die in Blast at Baghdad Hotel The New York Times (registration required)
- News Organizations in Baghdad Fired / Three Correspondents Died Asahi Shimbun (Japanese)
- Three foreign journalists killed in Baghdad AFP via Yahoo news
- Spanish Government to Demand Explanation to the U.S. for Death of its Cameraman Asahi Shimbun (Japanese)
- In Spain, Premier Is Focus of Anger at Journalist Deaths in Iraq The New York Times (registration required)
- Briefing at the Pentagon: 'We Choose Targets Carefully to Avoid Civilians' The New York Times (registration required)
