= Julio Anguita Parrado =

Spanish journalist and war correspondent

Julio A. Parrado
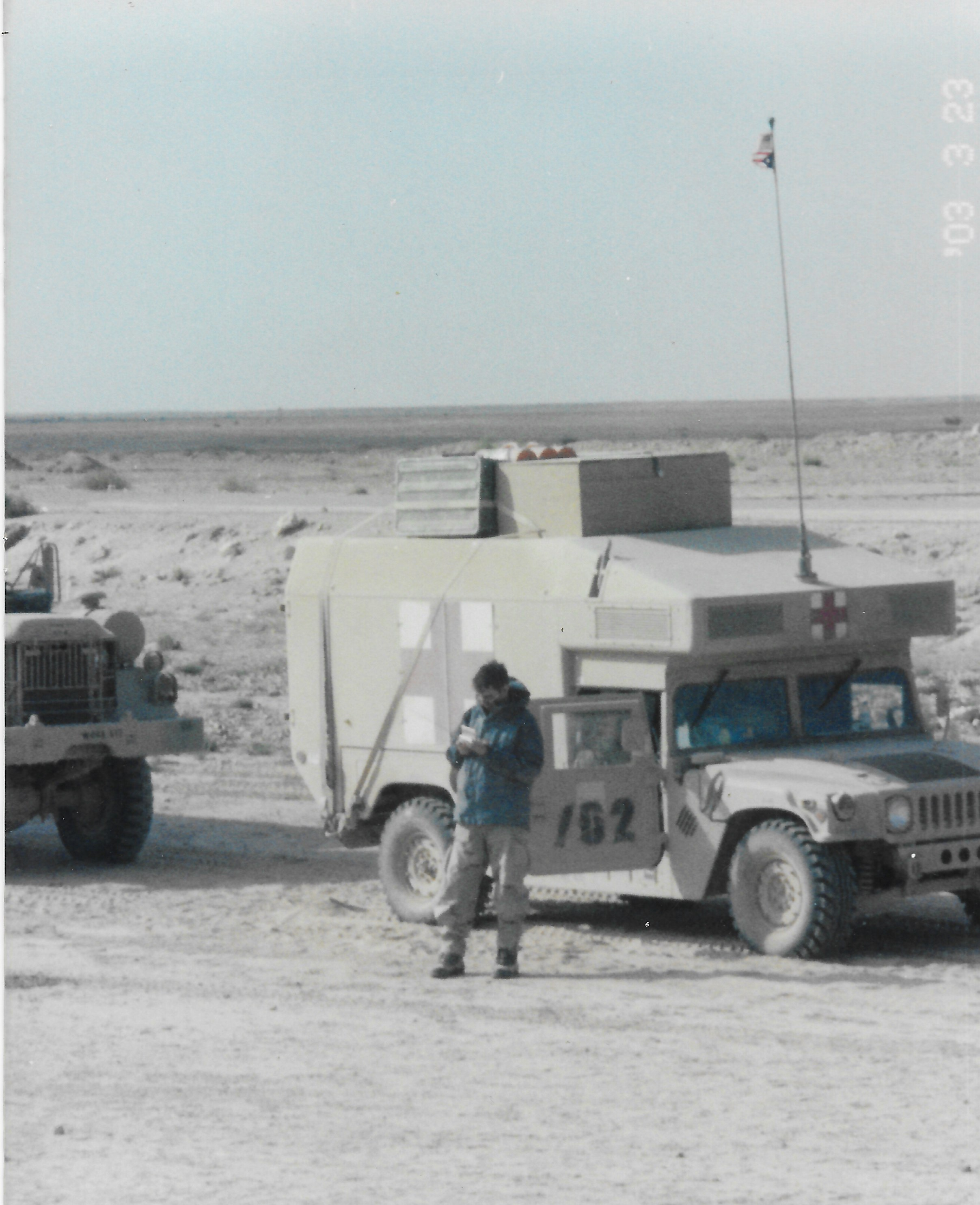
- Julio Anguita on the way to Baghdad
- Born: Julio Anguita Parrado; 3 January 1971; Córdoba, Spain
- Died: 7 April 2003 (aged 32); Baghdad, Iraq
- Education: Universidad Complutense
- Occupations: Journalist and war correspondent
- Parents: Julio Anguita (father); Antonia Rojas Parrado (mother)

Julio Anguita Parrado or Julio A. Parrado, as he often signed his articles (Córdoba, Spain, 3 January 1971 – Baghdad, Iraq, 7 April 2003), was a journalist and a Spanish war correspondent. He was the son of politician Julio Anguita González, and his mother, Antonia Rojas Parrado, was Deputy Mayor of the city of Córdoba. He was killed when an Iraqi missile hit him when he was in Baghdad covering the 2003 Iraq invasion.

== Education and career ==
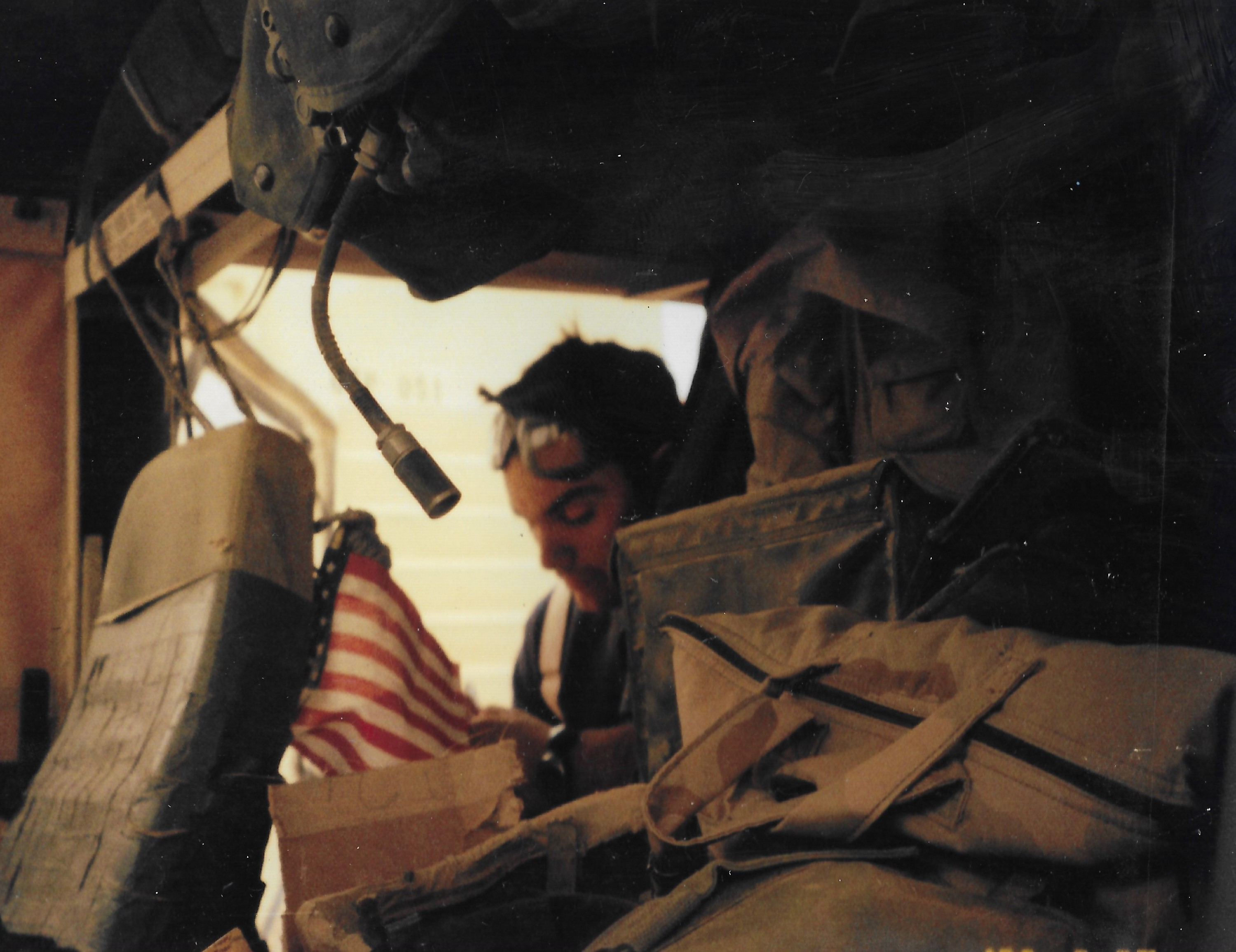

Julio Anguita Parrado studied journalism at the Complutense University. His active career began in the summer of 1990, and by August of that year he published his first story in the Cordoba Journal. He worked at the newspaper until 1993 when he began working with El Mundo (Spain), joining the international section. He always wanted to live in New York, a fact that got him to be appointed as an attached correspondent of El Mundo. There he had the opportunity to study a Master in Financial Reporting and to collaborate with the Latin portal starmedia.com. He witnessed live the attacks of September 11, being the first to report to the newspaper for which he worked.

He was prepared intensely for reporting the Iraq War, enlisting in a training course for war correspondents organized by the Pentagon. In February the Pentagon had conducted a training course for war correspondents at a military base of the U.S. Marines for journalists travelling embedded in the troops. From 21 March 2003, he covered the war with the Third Infantry Division of the U.S. Army.

== Death ==
Julio Anguita Parrado was working as an embedded journalist in the 2003 Iraq war. He was with the 2nd Brigade of the 3rd Infantry Division, advancing from the west and southwest of Baghdad. On 7 April 2003, he was south of Baghdad, about 15 miles from downtown, after crossing the country with troops from Kuwait. Parrado took what he felt was a wise decision. He chose to stay in the communications center of the 2nd Brigade, instead of travelling with the troops in the raid that they would perform on the center of Baghdad, believing he would be safer at the base. The base was unfortunately hit by a missile. According to Israeli daily Jerusalem Post, the missile came from a coordinated attack by militant Palestinian and Jordanian volunteers. This was the first military conflict that Parrado covered.

Early in the afternoon the American officer, Mike Birmingham, confirmed that two soldiers and two journalists were killed in a missile attack launched by Iraq. Just over an hour after another alarm was raised. By midafternoon, the Spanish Embassy in Washington confirmed the nationality of the dead: a Spanish journalist and a German. It was finally confirmed that Julio A. Parrado and German photographer Christian Liebig of Focus magazine were the deceased.

== Recognition ==
On 8 April, an extraordinary plenary session of the City Council of his hometown was called. That day was also declared a day of mourning in the city.

In 2007 the Union of Journalists Andalusian (SPA) and the Municipality of Córdoba established the Prize Julio Anguita Parrado of Journalism. Since its inception the winners have been:

- 2007: Iraqi writer and journalist Eman Ahmad Jamás
- 2008: Colombian journalist Eduardo González Márquez (2008)
- 2009: Congolese journalist Azzuba Caddy
- 2010: Journalist and human rights advocate Monica Fernandez Barnabas (2010)
- 2011: Spanish photographer and journalist Gervasio Sánchez.
- 2012: Egyptian journalist Shahira Amin
- 2013: Greek journalist Kostas Vaxevanis

== See also ==
- José Couso
