= José Couso =

Spanish cameraman

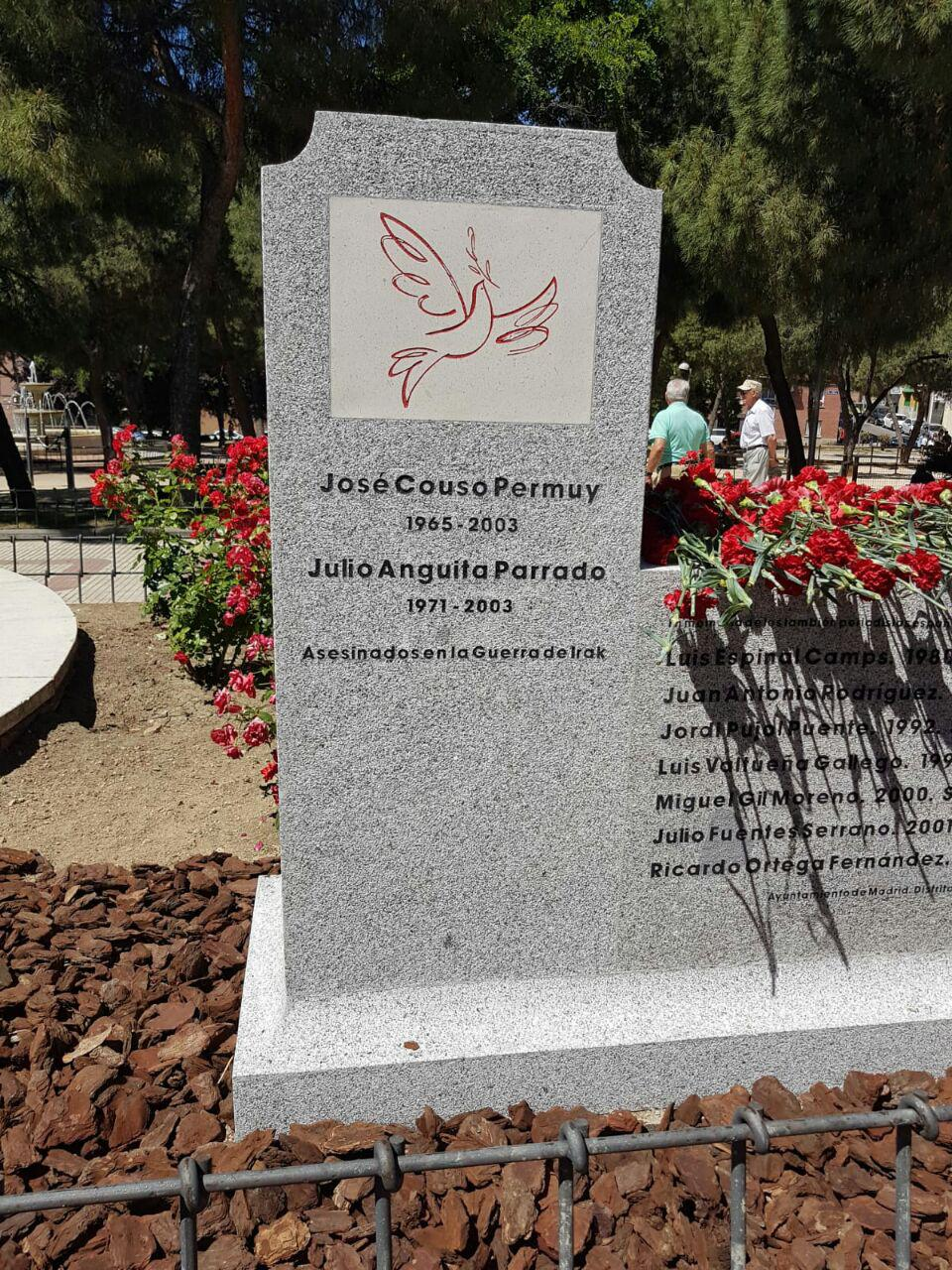
- Born: José Couso Permuy; 5 October 1965; Ferrol, Spain
- Died: 8 April 2003 (aged 37); Baghdad, Iraq
- Education: Complutense University of Madrid
- Occupation: Cameraman
- Known for: Cameraman killed by US Military

José Couso Permuy (5 October 1965 – 8 April 2003) was a Spanish cameraman who was one of the April 8, 2003 journalist deaths by U.S. fire after a U.S. tank fired at the Palestine Hotel in Baghdad, Iraq during the 2003 Iraq invasion.

== Biography ==
José Couso was born in Ferrol in 1965 to a family of military tradition. He graduated with a degree in Communication and Media Studies from Complutense University of Madrid. He worked on assignments for several organizations, including EFE and Canal Plus, and was a cameraman for the Telecinco television network for eight years, covering major news stories such as the kidnapping of his coworker Jon Sistiaga in Macedonia, the 1998 Baghdad bombings, the Kosovo War in 1999, various reports from the BIO Hespérides ship in Antarctica in 2001, a report from the French caves of Lascaux, the incident on Perejil Island during the same year, and the Prestige oil spill.

José Couso was married and had two children.

=== Iraq War ===
Couso went to Iraq, along with several coworkers from Telecinco, right before the 2003 invasion. Of the group, only two stayed in Baghdad: Jon Sistiaga as a journalist and José Couso as a camera operator. The other members of the team went back to Spain a few days before the bombings began.

On 8 April 2003, José Couso was at the Palestine Hotel, where many foreign reporters were staying. At that time, a company of the 3rd Infantry Division of the U.S. Army was fighting on the other side of the river Tigris. An M1 Abrams tank fired its 120mm Rheinmetall L44 cannon at the hotel. The round hit the 15th floor, where the Reuters team was staying, causing the immediate death of the Ukrainian journalist Taras Protsyuk. At the time, José Couso was filming on the 14th floor and was seriously injured. Couso was transported to a Baghdad hospital, where he died during an operation.

=== Military personnel involved ===
U.S. Army Staff Sergeant (then Sergeant) Shawn Gibson (alt: Timothy, Tom) of the U.S. 3rd Infantry Division is one of three US soldiers for whom a Spanish court issued an international arrest warrant citing the murder of Telecinco cameraman José Couso in April 2003.

The 38-year-old Gibson was commanding an M1 Abrams tank, when he was ordered to fire on Baghdad's Hotel Palestine after he reported seeing somebody with binoculars on the rooftop. His single shell hit a 15th floor balcony, killing Couso and Reuters cameraman Taras Protsyuk. He was later quoted as saying I didn’t fire immediately. I called my chiefs and told them what I’d seen. Ten minutes later they called me and told me to fire and I did. (Tape B, 1:11:45)

In August 2003 the US military announced the results of an enquiry into the incident, which concluded that the firing of the shell was legitimate because there was positive evidence they were under observation from attackers. Six months later Reporters Without Borders announced that, while they did not think there was a case against the three ground-level soldiers involved, they wanted to see an investigation launched into their superior officers.

In March 2006, the charges against Gibson were dismissed, but the Supreme Court of Spain overruled that decision in January 2007 and Gibson's arrest was reordered.

== Reactions to Couso's death ==
The Pentagon acknowledged the source of the attack, alleging that the soldiers who fired on the hotel, under the command of Sergeant Thomas Gibson, were replying to enemy fire.

Following the death of Couso, there were protests in front of the American diplomatic posts in Spain and several civil and judicial actions in order to determine the liability of the people involved. Up to now, there are still concentrations of people demanding justice on the 8th of each month in front of the United States Embassy in Madrid.

On 19 October 2005, the Audiencia Nacional of Spain opened a preliminary investigation with an international arrest warrant against three of the involved U.S. military personnel. During the investigation. it called as witnesses the journalists Olga Rodríguez, Jon Sistiaga and Carlos Hernández.

The Sala II de lo Penal of the Audiencia Nacional closed the investigation on 10 March 2006, saying that the event was an act of war, a decision which was appealed by the family of the deceased before the Tribunal Supremo. On 5 December 2006 the Supreme Court of Spain (Spanish: Tribunal Supremo) unanimously granted the appeal by Couso's family against the decision by the Audiencia Nacional.

Santiago Pedraz, judge of the Audiencia Nacional, reactivated the international arrest warrant against the 3 military personnel on 16 January 2007, after a protracted battle against the state prosecutor. Pedraz accused the soldiers of murder and of a crime against the international community.

On 27 April 2007, the judge indicted the three soldiers on the count of murdering Couso. He also accused them of a crime against the international community on the basis of having attacked journalists. The Sala de lo Penal revoked this decision on 13 May 2008, backing the position of the state prosecutor, which asked for the case to be dismissed.

On 21 May 2009, Judge Pedraz indicted the 3 U.S. soldiers again.

On 29 July 2010, Judge Santiago Pedraz launched a search and arrest warrant against the 3 U.S. soldiers.

== See also ==
- April 8, 2003 journalist deaths by U.S. fire
- Julio Anguita Parrado
