= Basevi =

Basevi is a surname that comes from Bathsheba. Notable people with the surname include:

- Abramo Basevi (1818–1885), Italian musicologist, associated with the music journal L'Armonia
- George Basevi (1794–1845), English architect
- James Basevi (1890–1962), British born art director and special effects expert
- James Palladio Basevi (1832–1871), British surveyor and army officer
