= Dolly Dawn =

American singer (1916–2002)

- Born: Theresa Anna Maria Stabile; February 3 1916; Newark, New Jersey, United States
- Died: December 11 2002 (aged 86) Englewood, New Jersey, United States
- Genre: Big Band
- Occupation: Musician
- Instrument: Vocals
- Years active: 1930s - 1981
- Label: RCA Records

Dolly Dawn (born Theresa Anna Maria Stabile; February 3, 1916 – December 11, 2002) was an American big band singer. She was vocalist with George Hall's Hotel Taft Orchestra in the 1930s, and later had a solo career.

== Early years ==
Dawn was born Theresa Anna Maria Stabile in Newark, New Jersey, on February 3 1916, and grew up in Montclair, New Jersey. Her parents were Italian immigrants; the jazz saxophonist Dick Stabile was a cousin.

== Career ==
Dawn initially was given the stage name Billie Starr when she sang on a radio station in Newark. An announcer thought her birth name was too long, so he began calling her Billie Starr. In 1935 she replaced Loretta Lee as vocalist with George Hall's orchestra; she was given the name Dolly Dawn by Harriet Mencken, a writer for the New York Journal-American. She and the band broadcast six days a week from the Grill Room of the Taft Hotel in New York via CBS Radio, and became very popular. Her most successful song with the band was "You're a Sweetheart", released in 1938. In 1937 a poll by The Orchestra World magazine named her the outstanding orchestra vocalist of the year.

As Dawn matured, she began to dislike her stage name. "I hated the name Dolly," she said. "It sounded like a stripper." Her friends called her Dawn Stabile.

On July 4, 1941, at the Roseland Ballroom in New York, George Hall officially turned the band over to her, and became her manager; the band was renamed "Dolly Dawn and Her Dawn Patrol". From 1942 she continued without the band, whose members were drafted during the Second World War. She appeared in clubs and dance halls and in other engagements throughout the US, and continued to record into the 1950s.

Resuming her career in 1976, Dawn performed in nightclubs, reprising songs from the big-band era. A review in The New York Times mentioned her "relaxed, unpretentious, straightforward manner of singing" as she performed with only a piano for accompaniment in 1978. A 1980 review noted improvement after "several relatively unimpressive appearances" and the addition of bass and drums to the piano accompaniment. The review commended her technique of adapting her style to each song.

In the early 1980s Dawn revived the Dawn Patrol name, singing accompanied by a trio on piano, bass, and drums.

A two LP compilation of Dolly Dawn's recordings with George Hall was issued by RCA Records in 1976, which led to appearances at jazz clubs and cabarets in New York. She recorded two new albums: Smooth as Silk, and in 1981 Memories of You.

Ella Fitzgerald said that Dawn was an influence on her own singing. On February 4, 1998, Dolly Dawn was inducted into the Big Band Hall of Fame in West Palm Beach, Florida.

== Personal life and death ==
Dolly Dawn became the adopted daughter of band leader George Hall.Dawn did not marry; she said her music was her husband and children. She died on December 11 2002, aged 86, from kidney failure at the Lillian Booth Actors Home in Englewood, New Jersey.
