= Egerton Crescent =

Street in Kensington, London

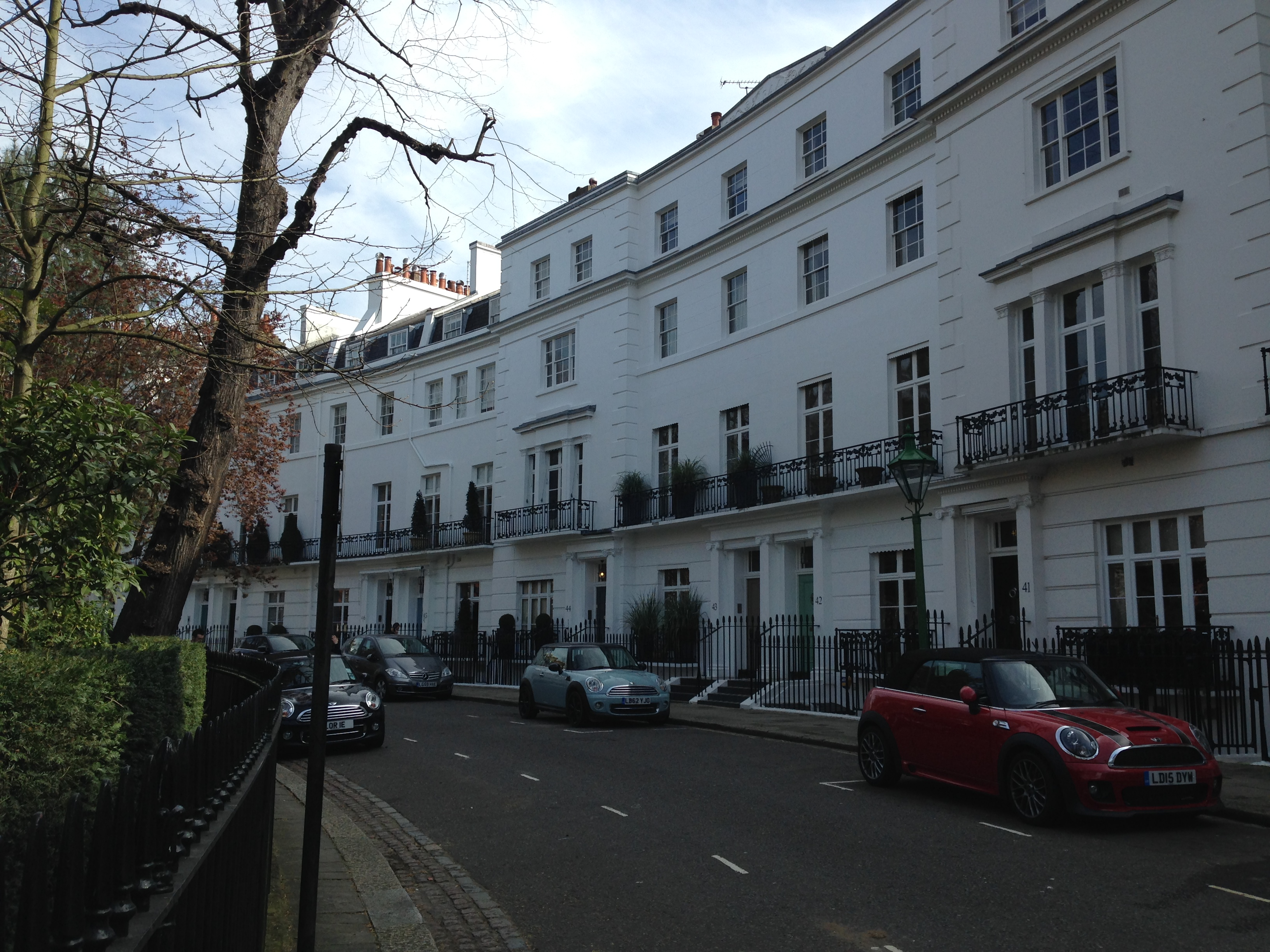
- Interactive map of Egerton Crescent
- Former name: Brompton Crescent
- Namesake: Francis Egerton, 3rd Duke of Bridgewater
- Length: 170 m (560 ft)
- Coordinates: 51°29′42.83″N 0°10′3.21″W
- From: Egerton Gardens
- To: Egerton Gardens

Construction
- Completed: 1840s

Other
- Designer: George Basevi

Egerton Crescent is a street in South Kensington, London, that was described in 2013 as "the most expensive street in Britain".

== Location ==
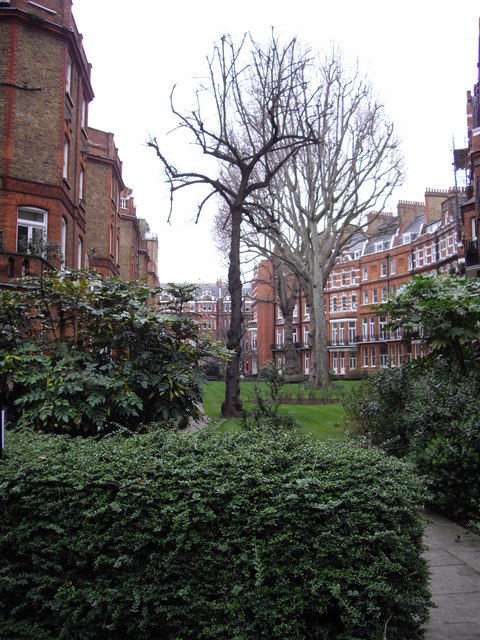
Egerton Crescent, on the right

The street runs roughly north to south in a curve, with both ends forming t-junctions on Egerton Gardens, which in turn runs roughly north to south between Egerton Terrace and Brompton Road.

== History ==
The houses were designed by George Basevi and built by James Bonnin in the 1840s, when it was called Brompton Crescent, but was renamed Egerton Crescent in 1896 in honour of Francis Egerton, 3rd Duke of Bridgewater.

In December 2013, it was named the "most expensive street in Britain", for the second successive year, with an average house price of £7.4 million.

In December 2015, it was the second most expensive street in England, with an average property price of £7,550,000, according to research from Lloyds Bank, based on data from HM Land Registry.

== Notable residents ==
- Major-General William Frederick Cavaye (1845–1926), British military officer and politician, lived at no 40
- David Frost (1939–2013), British journalist and broadcaster, lived there in the late 1960s
- John Lehmann (1907–1987) was an English poet and man of letters, lived at no 31 from 1945
- Lucas Malet, pseudonym of Mary St Leger Kingsley (1852–1931), novelist, lived at no 27 in 1902 (at least)
- Tony Richardson (1928–1991), English theatre and film director
- Jim Sharman (born 1945), Australian theatre and film director
- Michael White (1936–2016), British theatrical impresario and film producer, who bought the house from Richardson
