= Franklin Hotel, London =

Hotel in London, England

The Franklin Hotel
- Location within Central London

General information
- Location: 22-28 Egerton Gardens, Knightsbridge, London, England
- Coordinates: 51°29′45.89″N 0°10′7.1″W
- Opening: 2016
- Owner: Elisabetta Fabri
- Operator: Starhotels

Other information
- Number of rooms: 35 rooms

The Franklin London - Starhotels Collezione is a luxury 5-star hotel in London, England. It is located at 22-28 Egerton Gardens, Knightsbridge on the borders of Chelsea.

The hotel was built from merging four Victorian townhouses into one in 1992. The hotel is located near Brompton Road and Sloane Street and in close proximity to the Victoria and Albert Museum, Buckingham Palace and Kensington Palace.

It was closed for renovation in 2009, and reopened in 2016.
