= Rosa Grand =

Hotel in Milan, Italy

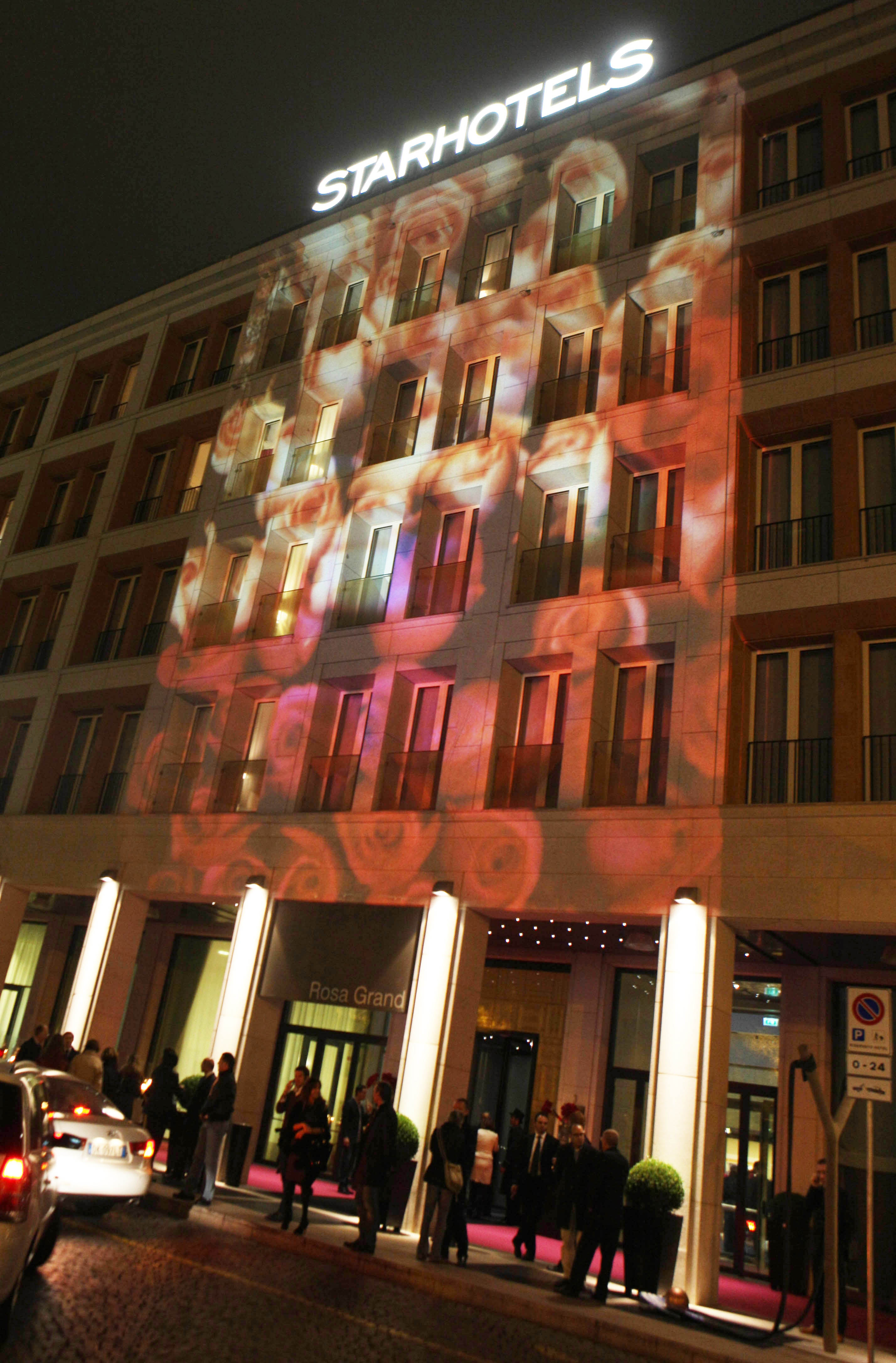

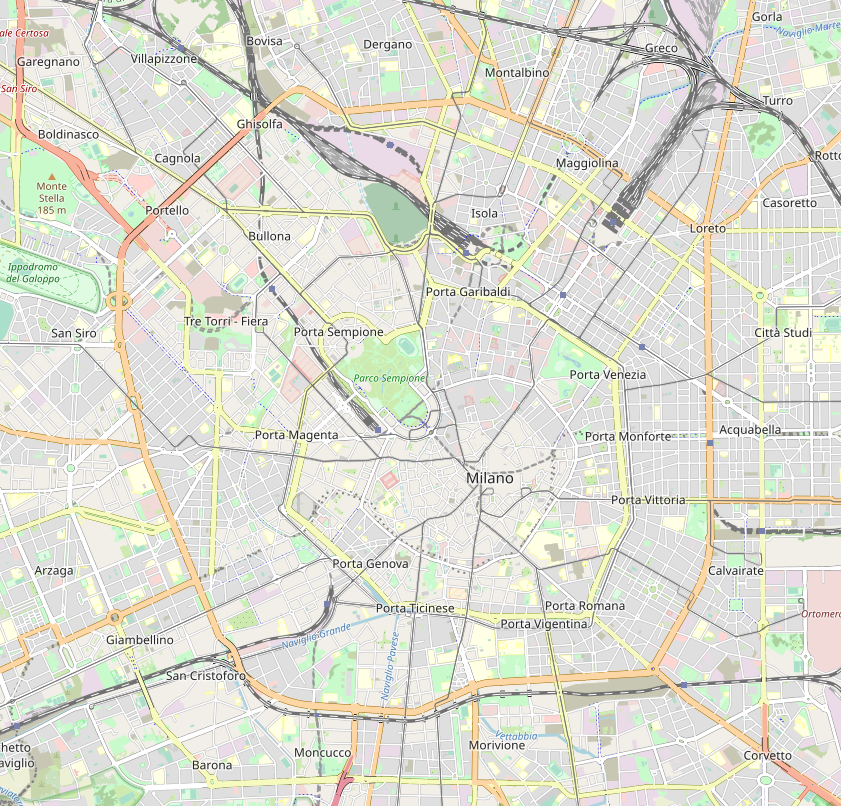
- Location within Milan

General information
- Location: Milan, Italy
- Coordinates: 45°27′49″N 9°11′38″E
- Owner: Starhotels

Other information
- Number of rooms: 370

Website
- Official website

The Rosa Grand is a 4 star hotel in Milan, Italy, owned by the Starhotels group. The Rosa Grand reopened after renovation in November 2009. The hotel is located in Milan's historical district immediately east of the Duomo Cathedral and Via Montenapoleone and has 370 Bedrooms. The hotel has 7 meeting rooms with an overall capacity of 535 people. The hotel features several works of art by Maurizio Galimberti.
