= Savoia Excelsior Palace =

Hotel in Trieste, Italy

Coordinates: 45°38′58″N 13°45′56″E

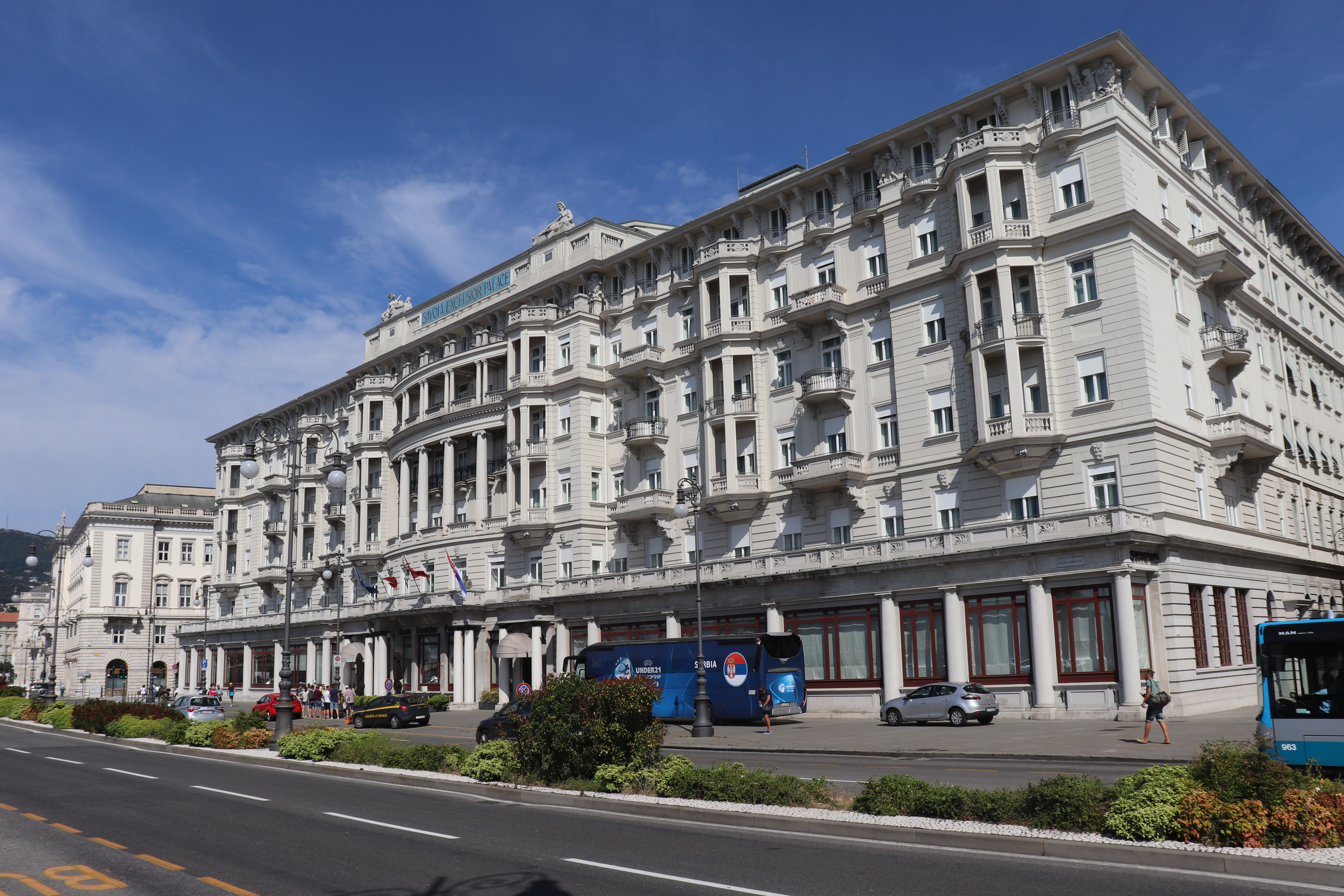
- Savoia Excelsior exterior view
- Interactive map of the Savoia Excelsior Palace area

General information
- Location: Trieste, Italy
- Owner: Starhotels

Technical details
- Floor count: 6

Other information
- Number of rooms: 144
- Number of suites: 18
- Number of restaurants: 1
- Parking: yes with valet service

Website
- Official website

The Savoia Excelsior Palace is a 4 star hotel in Trieste, Italy owned by the Starhotels group. The hotel is located close to Piazza Unità d'Italia overlooking the Gulf of Trieste and has 142 rooms (including suites and apartments). The hotel has a bar, "Le Rive", and a restaurant, "The Savoy", which seats up to 150 people. The hotel's conference centre has 9 meeting rooms which can seat up to 650 people in total. The hotel was used as a venue for part of the 2009 G8 summit meeting.

== History ==
The Savoia Excelsior Palace was built in 1911 by the Austrian architect Ladislaus Fiedler with classical sculptures and columns decorating the façade. At the time of its opening in 1912 the hotel was one of the most imposing and luxurious hotels in the Austro-Hungarian Empire. Throughout its history the hotel has hosted aristocrats, artists and diplomats, as well as tourists visiting Trieste on their grand tour. Emperor Franz Josef was a frequent guest and his private apartment is preserved intact. The hotel reopened in June 2009 after two and a half years of renovation.
