= Castille Paris =

Hotel in Paris, France

Coordinates: 48°52′06″N 2°19′37″E

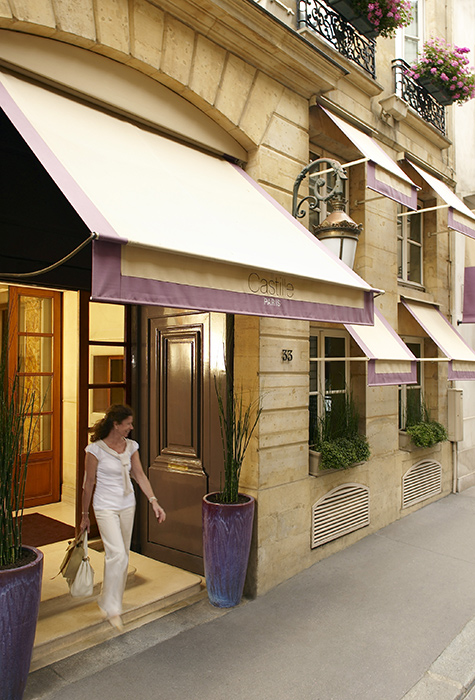
- Interactive map of the Castille Paris area

General information
- Location: Paris
- Owner: Starhotels

Other information
- Number of rooms: 108
- Number of suites: 21
- Parking: Valet parking

Website
- Official website

The Castille Paris (French pronunciation: [kastij paʁi]) is a 5-star hotel in Paris, France owned by the Starhotels group and marketed by Preferred Hotels and Resorts. The hotel is located in the heart of the city, between the Place de la Concorde and Place Vendôme, adjacent to Chanel's headquarters. The hotel has 108 rooms (of which 21 are suites) and the hotel's meeting rooms seat 70 people.
