= Splendid Venice =

Hotel in Venice, Italy

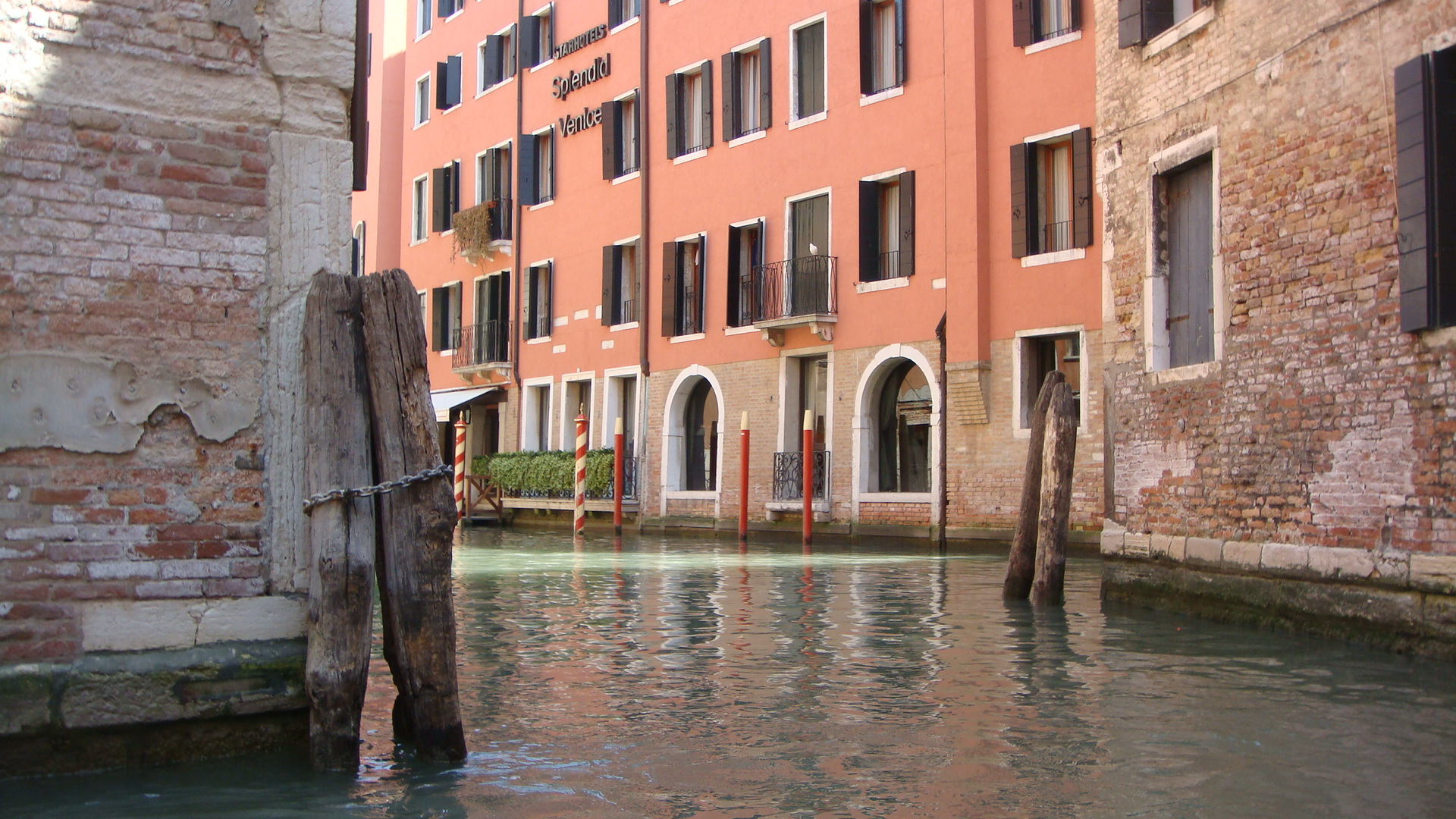
- Interactive map of the Splendid Venice area

General information
- Location: Venice, Italy
- Owner: Starhotels

Other information
- Number of rooms: 165
- Number of suites: 16

Website
- Official website

The Splendid Venice is a 4-star hotel in Venice, Italy, located between St. Mark’s Square and the Rialto Bridge. The hotel is owned by the Starhotels group and has 165 rooms (including 16 suites). The hotel has a private dock on the canals for access by gondola or water taxi.

== History ==
The hotel was built in the 16th century and was first built for use as an Inn, known as "Locanda Cappello Nero". In 1900, it changed its name to "Albergo Splendido" and again in 1930 to "Hotel Splendid". After transferring ownership to Starhotels, the hotel was renovated in 2007 and renamed the "Splendid Venice" hotel.

== Facilities ==
The hotel has a large Venetian outdoor courtyard (campiello) with a retractable glass roof, allowing year-round socializing. The hotel has a rooftop terrace and outdoor bar with panoramic views of St Mark's Campanile. The hotel's Le Maschere restaurant has a room of mirrors (Sala degli Specchi), which is available for private dinners.
