= James Bonnin =

English property developer (c. 1782–1850)

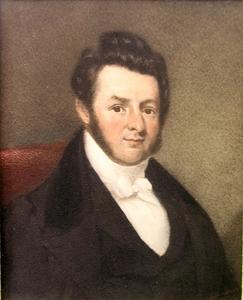
- Born: 1782
- Died: 8 January 1850 (aged 67–68)
- Occupation: Property developer

James Bonnin (about 1782 – 8 January 1850) was an English property developer who built more than three hundred houses in the Brompton, Kensington, Knightsbridge and Chelsea areas of London. In 1846, he was declared bankrupt, and decided to emigrate in 1849, but died a few days after arriving in Adelaide, South Australia.

== Early years ==
James Bonnin's birth and baptism records have not been found, but he was probably born between 1775 and 1782 in or around London. His parents were James Bonnin and his wife Susanna (formerly Brown) who were married in St Marylebone in 1770. Little is known of his early life, but it his clear that he was of French Huguenot extraction, as many of his siblings were baptised in French churches in and around the city of London.

== Career ==
Bonnin has been described as "the builder who more effectively than any other left his stamp on present-day Brompton." Around 1806, he was involved in a number of developments in the Hans Town area. Bonnin was then describing himself as a carpenter and undertaker. In 1815, the London Gazette reports a James Bonnin - builder, carpenter, dealer and chapman - of North Street, Kensington being declared bankrupt. However he seems to have recovered rapidly from this setback: in a trade directory for 1816-17 he is listed as a timber merchant with an address in Sloane Place. About 1819-20 Bonnin was involved in building in Knightsbridge (including Trevor Square), and in 1821 he undertook the initial development of Brompton Square.

His subsequent work was divided between for the Alexander Estate (starting in 1826) and Smith's Charity, which owned substantial areas of land in the Brompton area. His first contract for the charity started in 1822. He built a terrace of eight houses for the charity, (Onslow Terrace: later demolished to make way for the underground railway), on what is now the western end of Brompton Road.

Bonnin worked with a surveyor appointed by the charity, whose job was to handle the details of contracts and approve designs for the buildings. In 1828 George Basevi, an architect who was a cousin of Benjamin Disraeli, was appointed surveyor. Bonnin was a meticulous builder who produced high quality buildings and from then on, Basevi designed the houses and Bonnin built them. Between 1833 and 1844 they built Pelham Crescent, Pelham Place, part of Pelham Street and a small area of Fulham Road on either side of the Pelham Street junction.

Alongside the building, Bonnin had another venture. In 1802, his sister Susanna had married Samuel Cocks, a master pewterer in the City of London. At some point - probably after Samuel's death in 1820, Bonnin went into partnership with Susanna, who kept the Cocks pewter touch mark producing until 1844. Bonnin was admitted to the Freedom of the City of London as a Master Pewterer in 1836. His partnership with his sister was dissolved in 1838.

By 1843, Bonnin and his second son, also James Bonnin, were splitting further work on the estate between them. James junior was appointed to construct 6-10 (even) Pelham Street and some houses on the north side of Pelham Street which were eventually demolished to make way for the South Kensington station. Bonnin secured a much bigger project on the site of Brompton Grange, which was to result in the construction of Egerton Crescent, Egerton Terrace, Yeoman's Row and Crescent Place by 1849. Bonnin may only have been directly involved in the construction of Egerton Crescent and probably sub-contracted the rest of the work.

To finance these various developments, the Bonnins entered into arrangements with lenders and with other speculators. It is known, for example, that Bonnin borrowed £2,000 from a wine merchant in Pelham Crescent, on the security of his underlease of Nos. 50-53 Egerton Crescent.

Bonnin's partnership with architect George Basevi ended in 1845 when Basevi fell from one of the towers of Ely Cathedral and was killed.

== Personal life ==
In 1805 Bonnin married Elizabeth Moye, who subsequently bore him a large family. Elizabeth died in 1835, and Bonnin married Mary Ann Aldridge in 1838 and had five more children.

Following Basevi's death, Bonnin fell on hard times and in July 1846 he was again declared bankrupt. He explained his financial difficulties as being due to 'undertaking more than my means would justify, ... the fluctuations in the funds in 1845 and 1846, and fall in House property with some heavy losses'. There was a depression in the Kensington housing market about this time which may have caught him over-exposed financially.

Four of his sons from his first marriage had emigrated to South Australia and in 1849, faced with the prospect of the workhouse, he decided to join them. He managed to persuade the Kensington Board of Guardians to give him £10 so that he and his young family could emigrate to South Australia and start a new life. Bonnin, however, died in January 1850, only a few days after his arrival in Adelaide. He is buried in an unmarked plot in Adelaide's West Terrace Cemetery.
