= Mortimer House, South Kensington =

House in London, England

Mortimer House
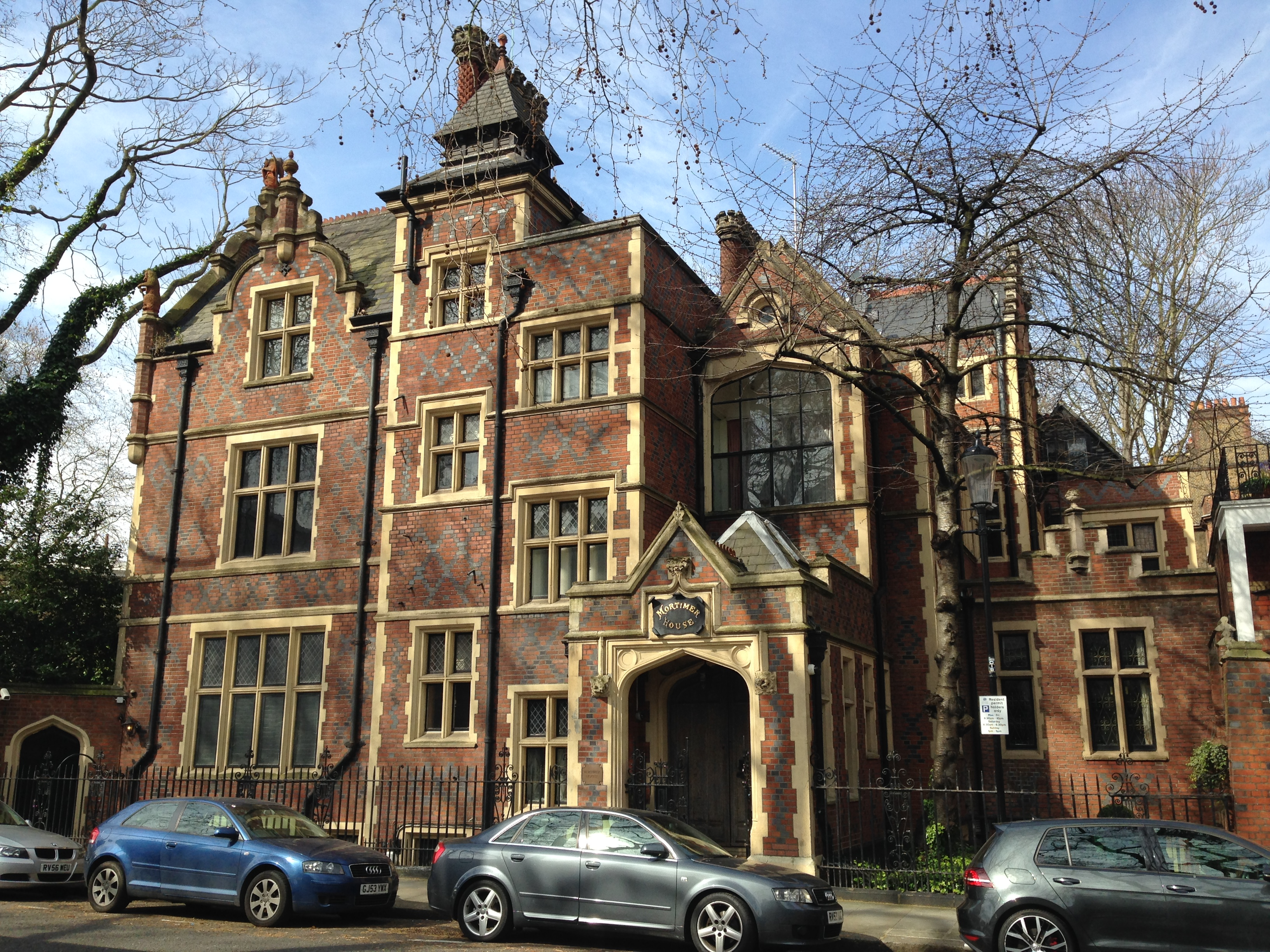
- The house in 2016

- Location within Greater London

General information
- Architectural style: Tudorbethan
- Location: Egerton Gardens, South Kensington, London, England
- Coordinates: 51°29′43.03″N 0°10′6.93″W
- Year built: 1888

Design and construction
- Main contractor: William Goodwin

Mortimer House is a large detached house on Egerton Gardens in the South Kensington district of London SW3. The house occupies a large corner plot on the corner of Egerton Gardens and the Brompton Road.

== Description ==
The site had been formally occupied by Crescent House, which had been inhabited by the former Governor of the Bank of England Edward Howley Palmer, since 1881. In the mid-1880s the trustees of the Smith's Charity estate, the local freeholders, agreed to Palmer's decision to rebuild the property. Palmer agreed with the trustees to pay a ground rent of £100 for the first year and £240 annually subsequently. The house was built by the Hatton Garden builder William Goodwin. It is not known who designed the house, nor why it was named Mortimer House.

Palmer had recently commissioned architect Richard Norman Shaw to design a house on Cadogan Square for him, but did not occupy it, and Palmer was last listed as the occupier of Mortimer House in 1892. Palmer sold the house in 1896. A Charles Sheridan Swan owned Mortimer House in the early 20th-century, his widow, Mary Kelly Swan, died there in 1909. The house was later sold in May 1913.

Mortimer House was owned by the chairman of British American Tobacco, Sir Frederick Macnaghten, in the 1950s and 1960s. His widow, Dame Ada, died there in 1969. The gardens of Mortimer House were open to the public in 1965 as part of the National Gardens Scheme. They were described by The Times as featuring "...an attractive display of roses and a rock garden".

The Survey of London felt that Mortimer House "...exudes an air of mystery and surprise amid the surrounding terraces of South Kensington". Mortimer House had been owned by the financier Nigel Broackes in the 1980s and was sold to a Middle Eastern buyer for £3 million in 1983. It has continued to be privately owned since then.

== Design ==
The house is built in the late 19th-century Tudorbethan style in red and blue interspersed brickwork, with various decorations including gables and statues of griffins and bears with shields. Tall groups of brick chimney stacks surmount the property. The stables of the house have a conical roof and are now garages. A swimming pool in a conservatory was added in the late 20th century. The Survey of London described the interior as having "...a predictable eclecticism of style, ranging from Jacobean in the long hallway containing an oak open-well staircase with twisted balusters and wide handrail to Adamesque in the double drawing-room at the front. The fittings include fine marble chimneypieces in a late-eighteenth-century manner. A room on the first floor may originally have been used as a chapel." The London: North volume of the Pevsner Architectural Guides describes Mortimer House as "a picturesque composition", highlighting its "Tudor chimneys with crenelated pots and stone mullions".
