= Egerton Gardens =

Garden square in South Kensington, London

Coordinates: 51°29′47.13″N 0°10′6.94″W

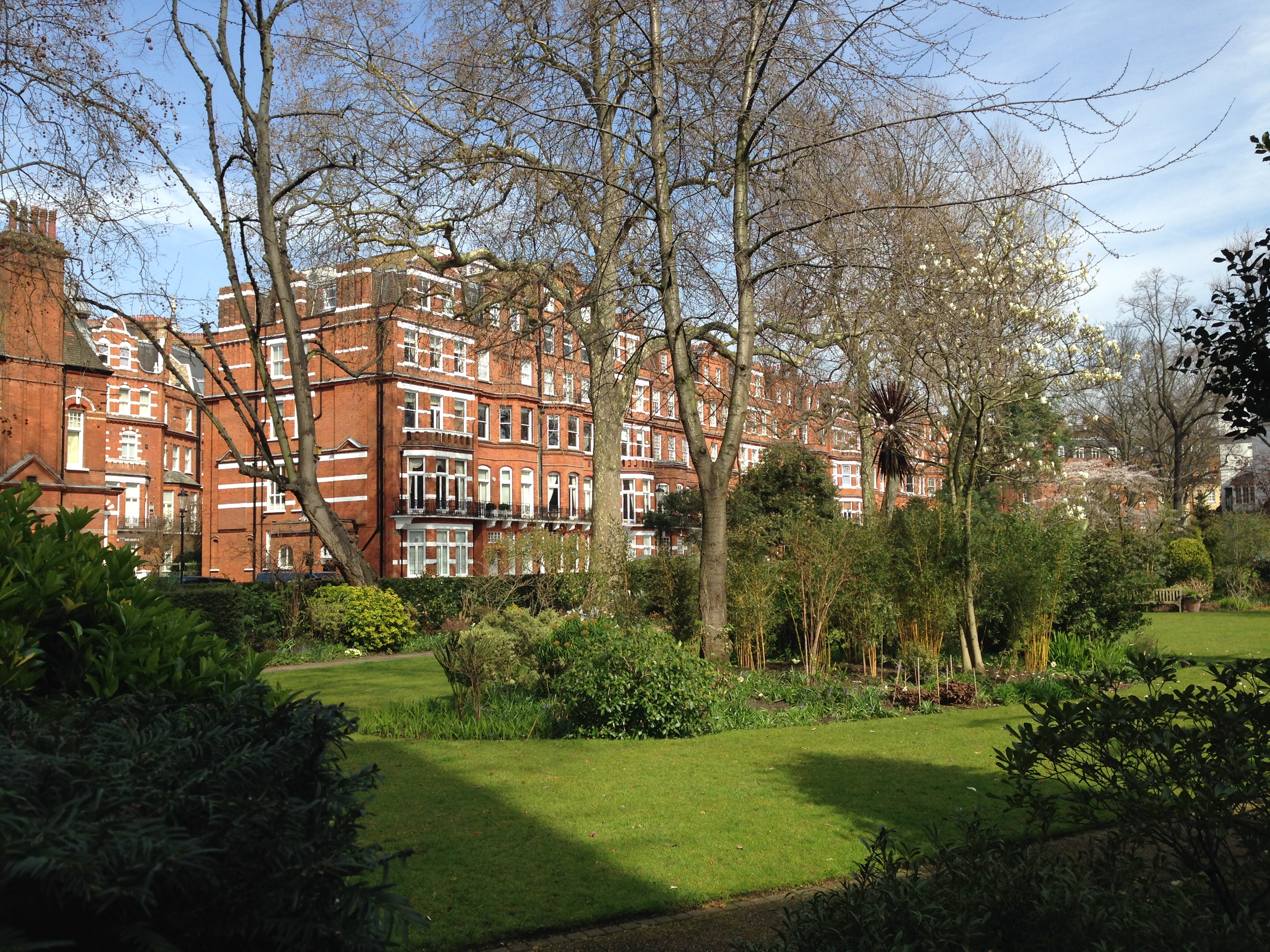
Egerton Gardens from Egerton Crescent, across the communal gardens

Egerton Gardens is a street and communal garden, regionally termed a garden square, in South Kensington, London SW3.

== Location ==
The street runs roughly south-west to north-east, off Brompton Road. Egerton Crescent, runs roughly off it, and Egerton Terrace crosses it. Historially for more than 800 years the area formed part of Brompton, parochially in the Church of England this is recognised by the name of its parish Holy Trinity Brompton.

== History ==
Much was built by Alexander Thorn, and the architect for most was probably Maurice Charles Hulbert.

Notable houses include Mortimer House.

The Franklin Hotel at 22-28 Egerton Gardens was created by combining four houses.

No 31 was designed by Thomas Henry Smith for Lieutenant-Colonel William Wetherly, but is now flats.

== Notable residents ==
- No 1 Admiral Sir Michael Seymour.
- No 17 Major-General Charles Edmund Webber, the street's first occupant, in 1887.
- No 31 Sir Ronald Waterhouse, judge, lived in a flat there from 1957 to 1958.
- No 38 William Romilly, 2nd Baron Romilly, who died in a fire there with two servants in 1891.
- No 41 Sir Guy Stephenson, barrister, until his death in 1930.
- No.44 Ruth Ellis, the last woman to be hanged in Britain, lived in a bed-sitting room there in 1955.
- No 49 Valentine Browne, 5th Earl of Kenmare in 1907 (at least)
- No 53 Florence Tyzack Parbury, socialite, author, musician, painter and traveller
