= Holy Trinity Twickenham =

Coordinates: 51.4434°N 0.3413°W

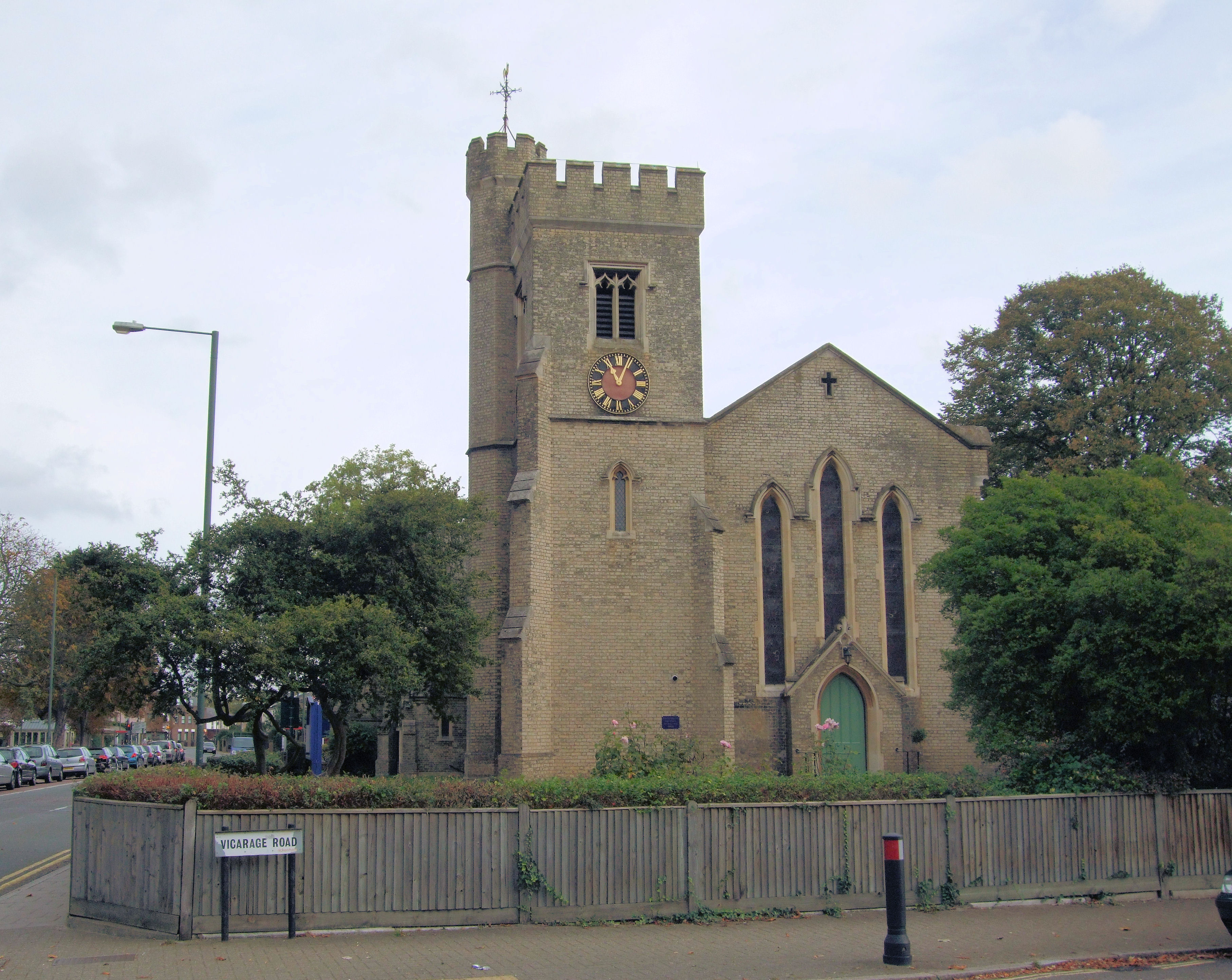
- Holy Trinity Twickenham
- Holy Trinity Twickenham
- OS grid reference: TQ 15366 72894
- Location: 1 Vicarage Road, Twickenham TW2 5TS
- Country: England
- Denomination: Church of England
- Website: holytrinitytwickenham.org

Architecture
- Years built: 1841

Administration
- Diocese: Diocese of London
- Archdeaconry: Middlesex
- Deanery: Hampton

Clergy
- Vicar: Simon Couper

Listed Building – Grade II
- Designated: 6 May 1952
- Reference no.: 1253012

Holy Trinity Twickenham is a Grade II listed Church of England church on Twickenham Green in Twickenham in the London Borough of Richmond upon Thames, originally built to relieve pressure on the parish church of St Mary following a campaign backed by MP Sir William Clay. Its vicar is Simon Couper. The church building dates from 1841. It was designed by George Basevi and extended in 1863.
