= George Hall (musician) =

American bandleader (c. 1893 – c. 1989)

- Born: c. 1893
- Died: c. 1989
- Genres: Swing
- Occupation: Bandleader
- Years active: 1920s–1930s
- Label: Bluebird

George Hall (c. 1893 – c. 1989) was an American bandleader in the 1920s and 1930s. With the vocalist Dolly Dawn, his band was most popular in the late 1930s.

== Career ==
Hall, described by George T. Simon as "an affable man who looked more like the chief buyer in a men's clothing store than a bandleader", performed with his band in the 1920s in the Arcadia Ballroom in New York, as "George Hall and His Arcadians". The band was successful, and they recorded for Pathe Actuelle. In the early 1930s, the band moved to the Grill Room of the Taft Hotel in New York; the band was renamed "George Hall and His Hotel Taft Orchestra". They played there for eight seasons.

At the start of their contract with the hotel, Loretta Lee sang with the band, and they began making recordings for Bluebird Records. They also performed at other venues in New York, and toured the US, playing in venues including The Roosevelt in New Orleans and The Claridge in Memphis.

In 1935, the vocalist Dolly Dawn joined the band, replacing Lee. Often heard on the radio with the band, she became very popular, and they made hit records, the most successful being "You're a Sweetheart", released in 1938. On July 4, 1941, at the Roseland Ballroom in New York, Hall officially turned the band over to her, leaving the music business, and she renamed the band "Dolly Dawn and Her Dawn Patrol". In March 1942, she continued without the band, whose members were drafted during the Second World War.
