= St Thomas' Church, Stockport =

Coordinates: 53.4036°N 2.1550°W

St Thomas' Church
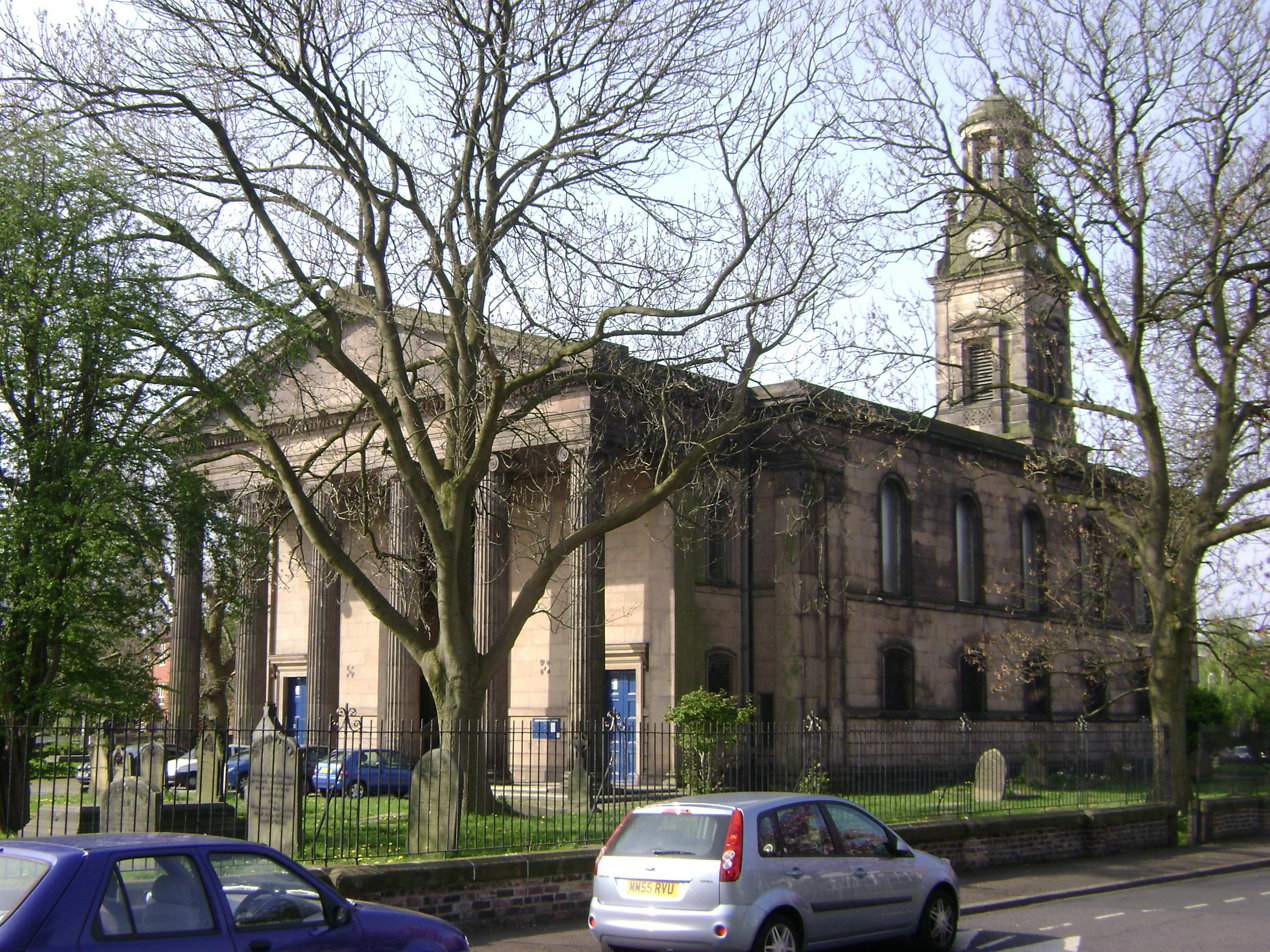
- St Thomas' Church, from the north-east in 2009

- Location in Greater Manchester
- OS grid reference: SJ 898 897
- Location: St Thomas's Place, Wellington Road South, Stockport, Greater Manchester
- Country: England
- Denomination: Church of England
- Churchmanship: Modern Catholic
- Website: St Thomas, Stockport

History
- Status: Church
- Consecrated: 25 September 1825

Architecture
- Functional status: Inactive as of December 2024
- Heritage designation: Grade I
- Designated: 14 May 1952
- Architect: George Basevi
- Architectural type: Church
- Style: Neoclassical
- Groundbreaking: 1822
- Completed: 1825
- Construction cost: £15,611

Specifications
- Materials: Stone

Administration
- Province: York
- Diocese: Chester
- Archdeaconry: Macclesfield
- Deanery: Stockport
- Parish: Stockport and Brinnington

St Thomas' Church is in St Thomas's Place, Wellington Road South, Stockport, Greater Manchester, England. It is an active Church of England (C of E) church in the parish of Stockport and Brinnington, in the deanery of Stockport, the archdeaconry of Macclesfield, and the Diocese of Chester. The church is recorded in the National Heritage List for England (NHLE) as a designated Grade I listed building. It was a Commissioners' church, having received a grant towards its construction from the Church Building Commission. It was decommissioned as a Parish Church in December 2024, due to low congregation numbers.

When it was built, Stockport was in the county of Cheshire, and it was the only church in that county to receive money from the first parliamentary grant administered by the commission. It was designed by the architect George Basevi, and was one of his earlier works. It is his only surviving Commissioners' church.

== History ==
The church was built between 1822 and 1825, at a cost of £15,611 (equivalent to £1,260,000 as of 2025), A grant of £15,636 was given by the Church Building Commission.^{[A]} The contractors were Samuel Buxton and Son, and the land was given by Lady Warren-Bulkeley. The church was consecrated on 25 September 1825 as the daughter church of St Mary, Stockport. At the time it was built it could seat 2,000. The church was refurbished by T.H. Allen in 1881, and the chancel remodelled by Medland Taylor in 1890. The original seating has been replaced, but the galleries have survived.

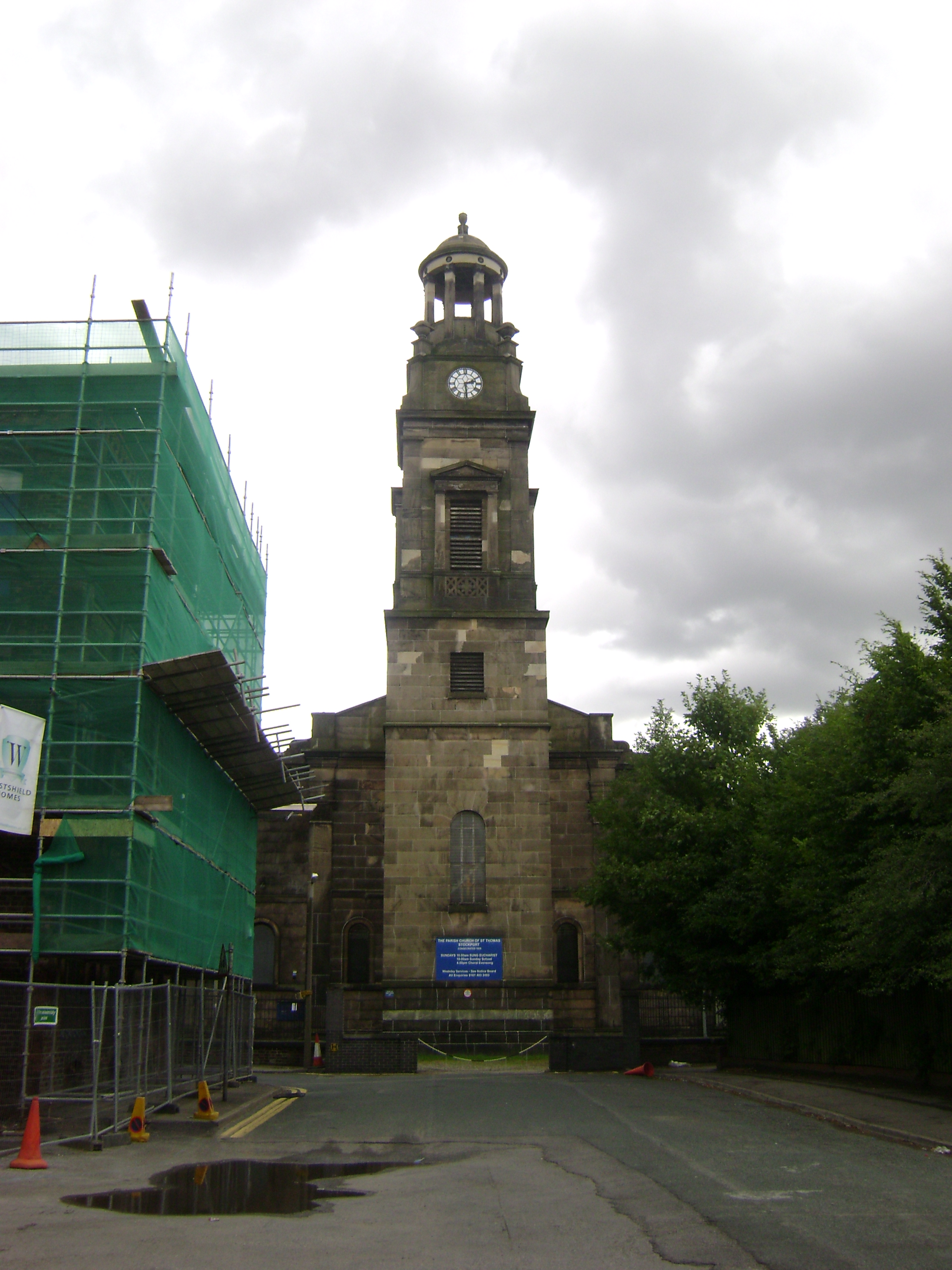
The church in 2008

== Architecture ==
=== Exterior ===
St Thomas' is a Greek Revival building, constructed in ashlar Runcorn sandstone. It is rectangular in plan, six bays long, with a clock tower attached at the west end and a massive portico at the east, its pediment supported by six Ionic columns. When the church was begun, the portico provided a frontage onto what was then the main road. A recessed central entrance beneath the portico gives entrance to the galleries, while flanking doors lead to the vestries.

Toward the top of the tower are bell openings with pediments, above which is a stage containing a clock face on each side and ball finials at the corners. The tower is surmounted by an open cupola carried on eight plain columns. Basevi was unhappy with the modifications to the designs of the towers at Stockport and at St Mary's in Greenwich imposed by the Commissioners, and these were the only two churches he designed for them The north and south sides of the church have two tiers of windows, the upper ones with round-arched heads, and the lower ones segmental heads.

=== Interior ===
The church has galleries on three sides. They are carried on square columns, which are continued up to the ceiling in the form of fluted Corinthian columns. The chancel, remodelled in 1890 is raised, and surrounded on three sides by a balustrade. A semi-circular pulpit extends from the front of the balustrade on the north side; its lower part is in stone, and the upper in ironwork. In the corresponding position on the south side is a brass eagle lectern. The marble reredos behind the high altar is carved with a depiction of the Annunciation. Above this is a copy of part of Raphael's painting Transfiguration of Jesus. In the south aisle is St John's Altar, which was moved from the mission church of St John when it closed in 1941. The east end of the north aisle is used as the Lady chapel. The baptistery contains an octagonal font, and is floored with a mosaic depicting fishes. The stained glass dates from the late 19th century, and depicts scenes from the life of Jesus.

The three-manual organ was made in 1834 by Samuel Renn. Its choir division was added in 1868 by Jardine, and the organ was cleaned and overhauled in 1890 by Alex Young.

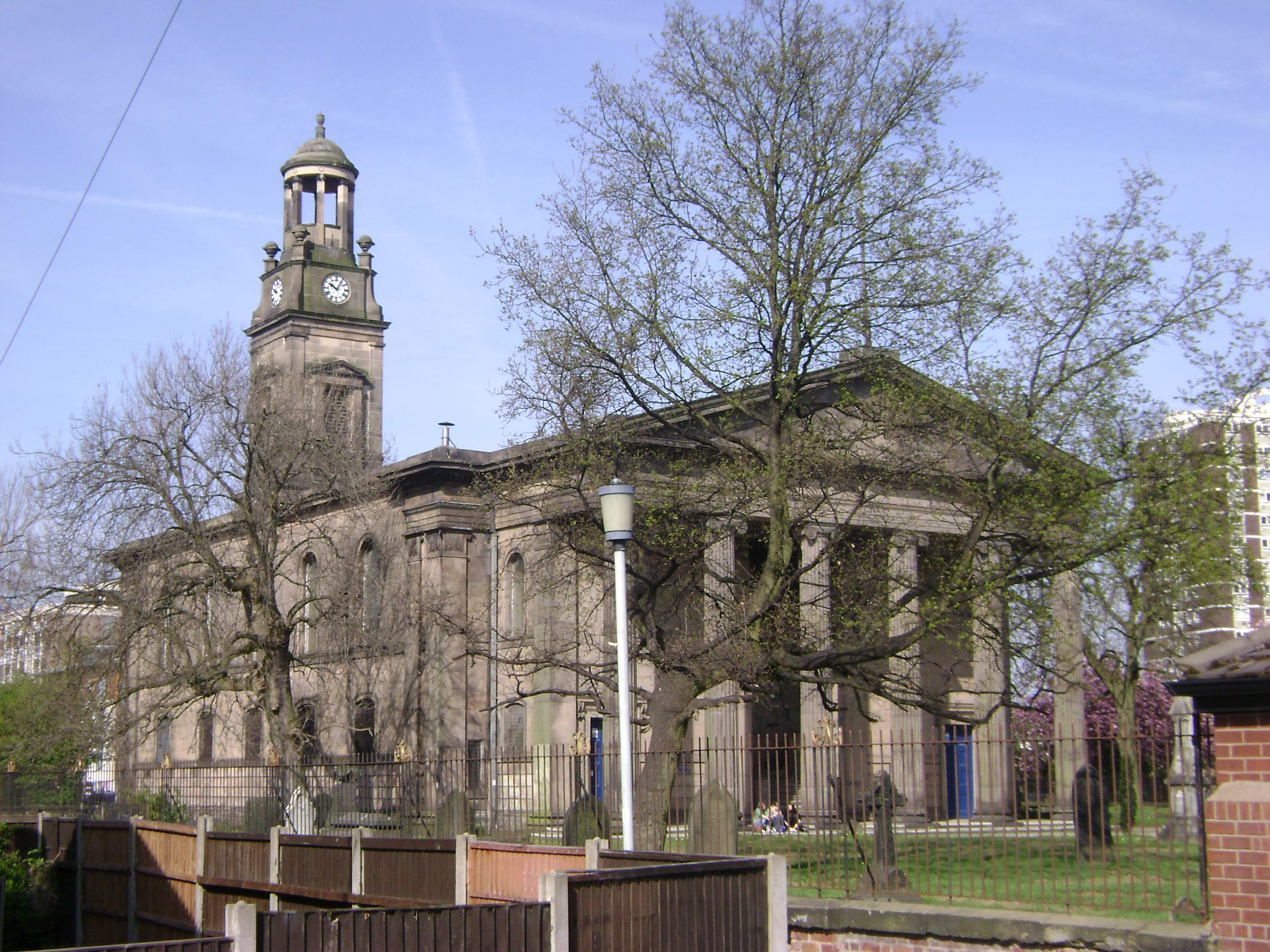
The church in 2009

== Present day ==
Services are held in the church on Sundays and major Christian festivals, and are usually accompanied by a robed choir. Recent repairs and restorations have including replacing the roof, and repairing the clock faces and upper parts of the tower. In 2014, new washroom facilities were installed along with disabled access, at a cost of £45,000, to enable the church to be more effectively used as a venue for concerts and recitals. The upper gallery ceilings were completely restored in 2016.

The church stands in the modern Catholic tradition of the Church of England.

In 2026 the church was purchased by the local congregation of the Coptic Orthodox Church, and named St Mary and St Thomas Coptic Orthodox Church. The church has been renovated and is now used for regular worship by the large and mixed congregation of Coptic Orthodox in Manchester and the surrounding areas.

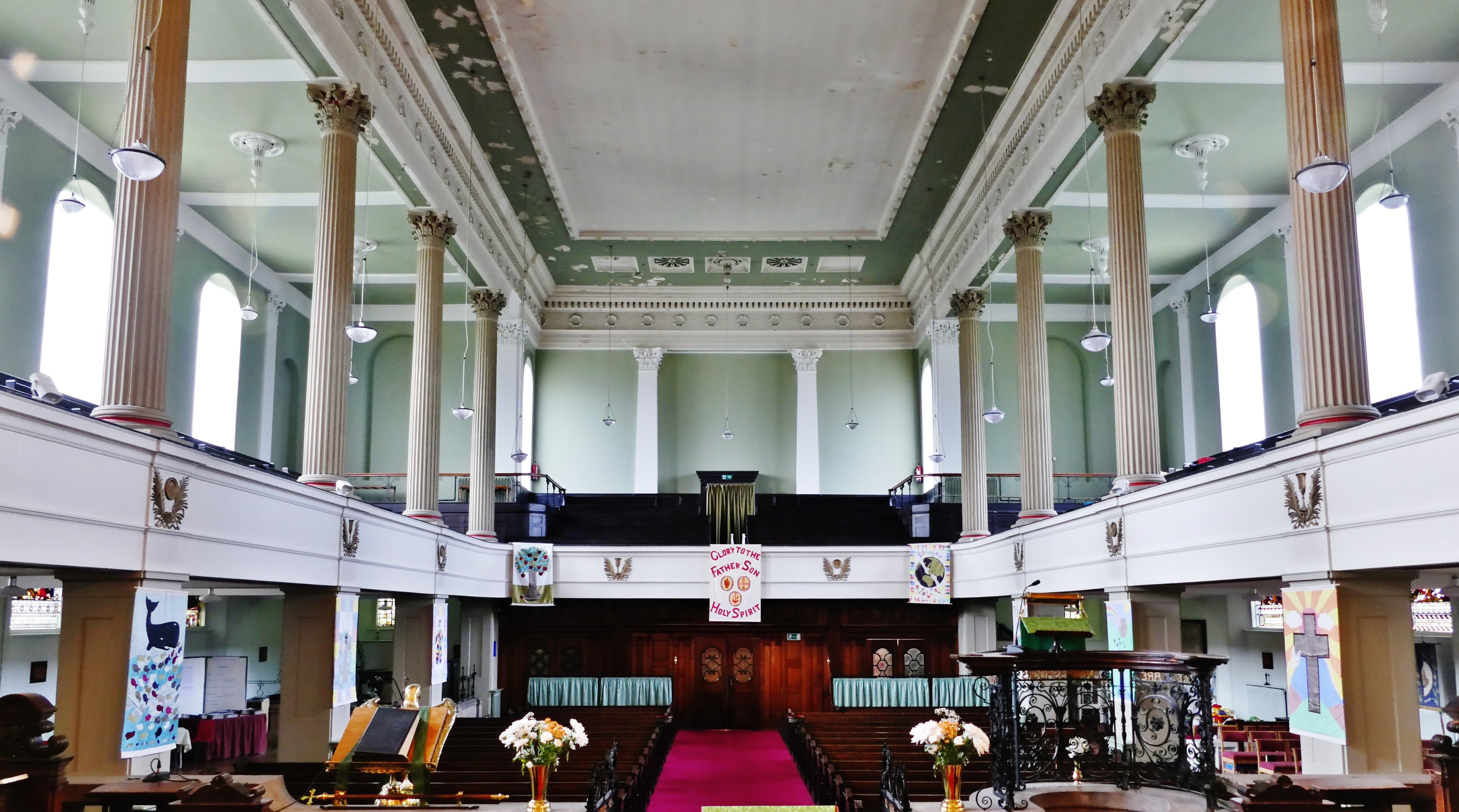
Interior of St Thomas' Church, 2018

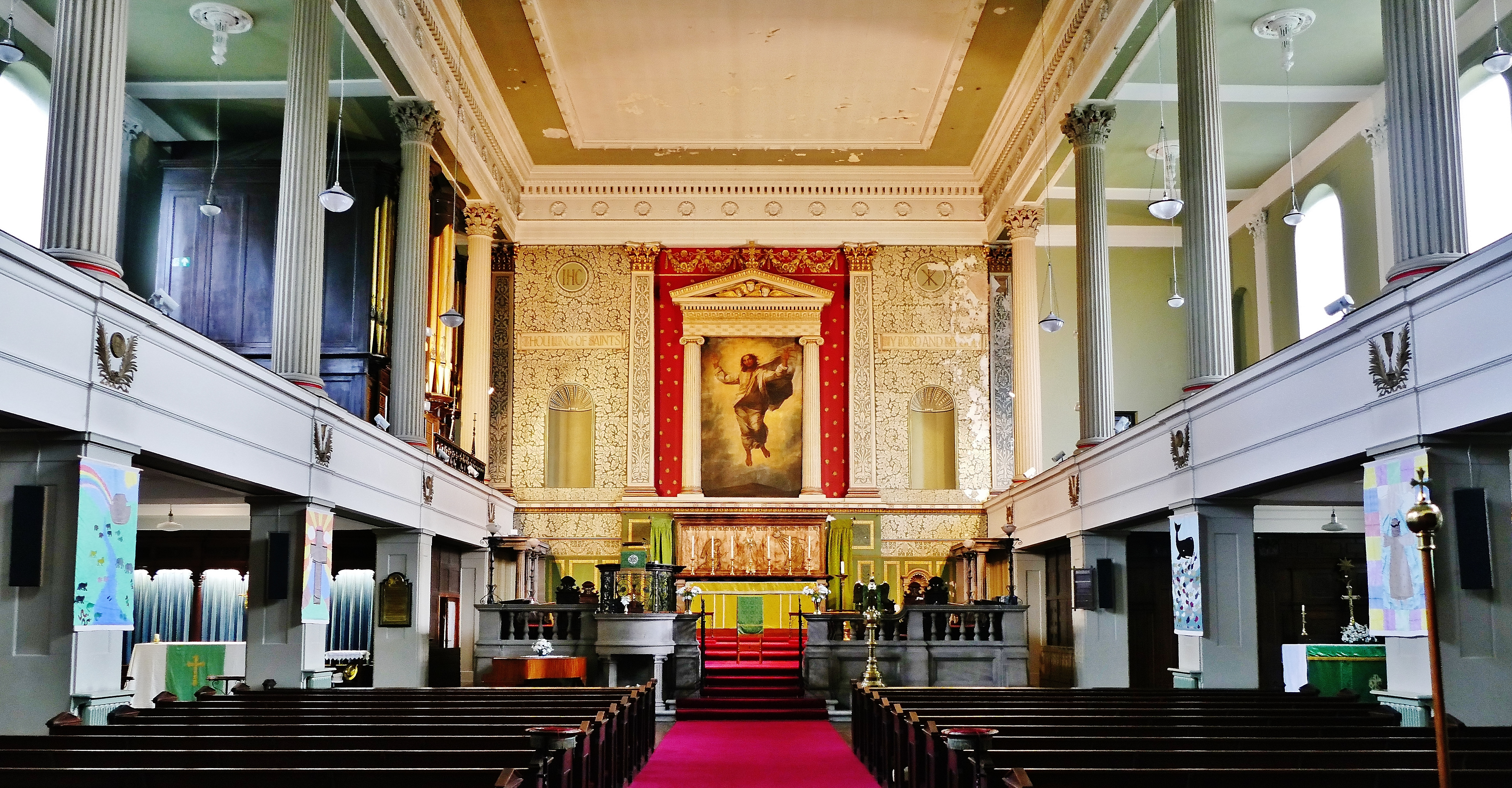
St Thomas' Church, 2018

== See also ==
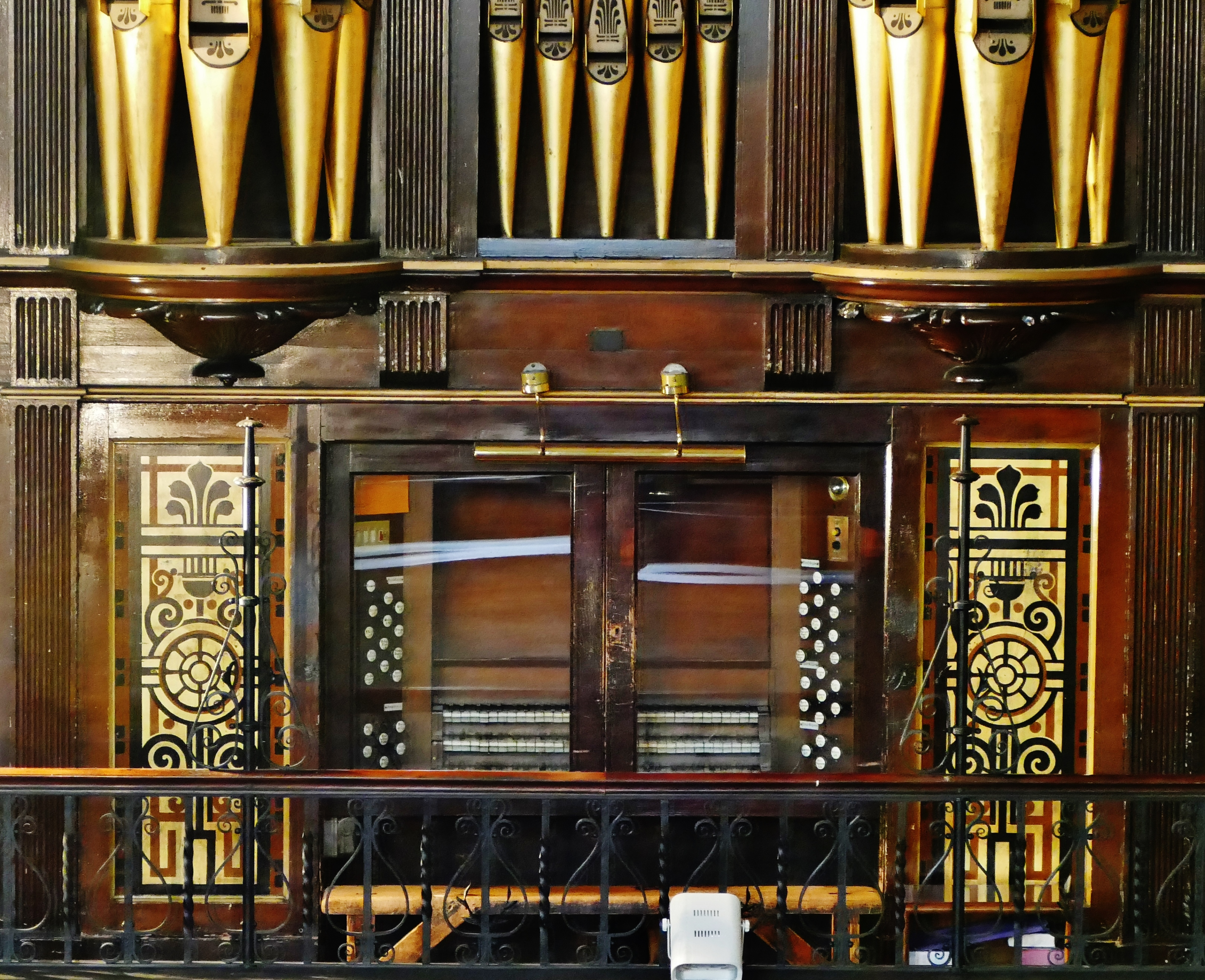
The Renn Organ at St Thomas' Church, installed in 1834 at cost of £500

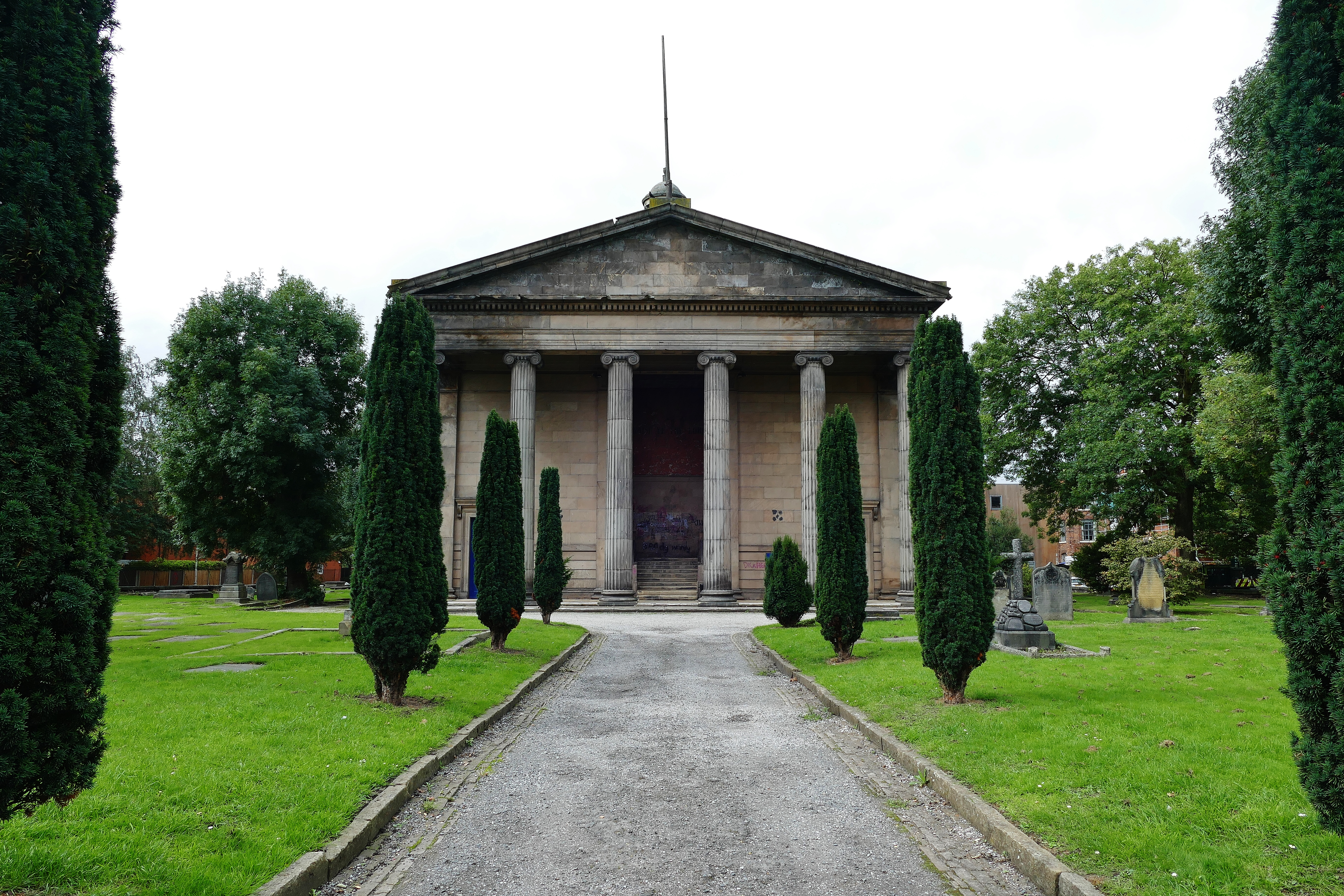
Exterior of St Thomas' Church showing the Portico Columns in 2018

- Grade I listed buildings in Greater Manchester
- Grade I listed churches in Greater Manchester
- Listed buildings in Stockport
- List of Commissioners' churches in Northeast and Northwest England

== Notes ==
^{A} In some cases, as in this one, the size of the grant was greater than the actual construction cost because it also included contributions towards the cost of the site, legal fees, etc.
