= Starhotels Anderson =

- Interactive map of the Starhotels Anderson area

General information
- Location: Milan, Italy
- Coordinates: 45°29′00″N 9°12′33″E
- Owner: Starhotels

Technical details
- Floor count: 9

Other information
- Number of rooms: 106
- Number of restaurants: 1

Website
- Official website

Starhotels Anderson is a 4 star hotel located next to the central station in Milan, Italy, owned by the Starhotels group. The hotel has 106 rooms, a gym, a spa and 4 conference rooms with an overall capacity of 70. The hotel's restaurant, Black, specialises in a fusion of local and international cuisine.
