= Loretta Lee =

American singer (1913–1977)

- Born: Margaret Viegas or Vieages; June 14, 1913; New Orleans, Louisiana
- Died: January 21, 1977 (aged 63)
- Education: Peabody Conservatory of Music
- Occupation: Singer
- Spouse: Irvin L. Dussom

Loretta Lee (June 14, 1913 – January 21, 1977) was an American singer in the first half of the 20th century.

== Early years ==
Lee was born Margaret Viegas (or Vieages) in New Orleans, the daughter of a juvenile court judge, Joseph Viegas (or Vieages), and his wife. Her ancestry was Spanish on her father's side and Irish on her mother's side. She was educated at a convent in New Orleans, but left that city as a teenager because her parents opposed her romance with a young Frenchman.

She sang with the Boswell Sisters at charity functions when she was a youngster and later studied music at the Peabody Conservatory of Music, winning a Peabody scholarship for four years and a Juilliard scholarship for one year. She was the third Peabody student to graduate as a singer. On June 1, 1927, radio station WBAL in Baltimore, Maryland, broadcast one of her recitals.

== Career ==
A visit to a publishing house during a trip to New York City in 1932, when she was 18, led to a singing engagement for Lee at a New York night club, launching her career. George Hall, leader of the orchestra at the Hotel Taft, heard her singing and invited her to perform with his orchestra, which she did that same evening. A year later, she was also the female singer with Hall and his orchestra on his program on CBS radio.

In the fall of 1935, she became a featured vocalist on Your Hit Parade, as the program's lineup of performers was revamped. Also in 1935, she was the singer on a comedy program that featured Marty May and Carol Deis, and she had her own program on CBS radio. In 1937, she became the main vocalist on a new radio program featuring Werner Janssen and his orchestra.

She also performed in theaters in vaudeville engagements and appeared in the short film Midnight Melodies.

== Personal life ==
Lee was married to Irvin L. Dussom.
