= J. P. Basevi =

James Palladio Basevi (23 February 1832 – 17 July 1871) was a British army engineer who conducted one of the first gravimetric surveys in India using a pendulum. He served as Deputy Superintendent of the Great Trigonometrical Survey of India and died of altitude sickness while conducting pendulum based surveys in the Himalayas.

Basevi was the son of the architect George Basevi. Educated at Rugby and Cheltenham College, he showed talent in mathematics, winning a Pollock Medal before joining the East India Company as an army engineer. He worked in Bengal briefly but joined the Great Trigonometrical Survey in 1856. In 1862 he surveyed the eastern side of the Indian Peninsula. In 1864 he began to conduct pendulum surveys using instruments from the Royal Society that had belonged to General Edward Sabine. His survey noted the increase in gravity from the equator towards the north but with irregularities. He noted that the Himalayas indicated a low density of mass below and high density towards the south of India. He also found that this tendency extended south even beyond the land and in stations out in the sea. He then sought to examine the situation at high altitudes and travelled into Kashmir. He travelled to Leh, Moré, Changchenmo Valley, and upon reaching the final station on the 15th of July 1871, he became ill. He suffered from pains in the chest and he was given steam to inhale and on the morning of 17th he got up but felt very ill, dressed up, lay down and died in his bed with blood oozing from his nostrils, mouth, ears, and eyes. The cause of death has been noted as being pneumonia. His body was buried in Srinagar. Basevi had been elected Fellow of the Royal Asiatic Society in 1864. A clock tower commemorating him was constructed at the Survey of India office in Dehra Dun.

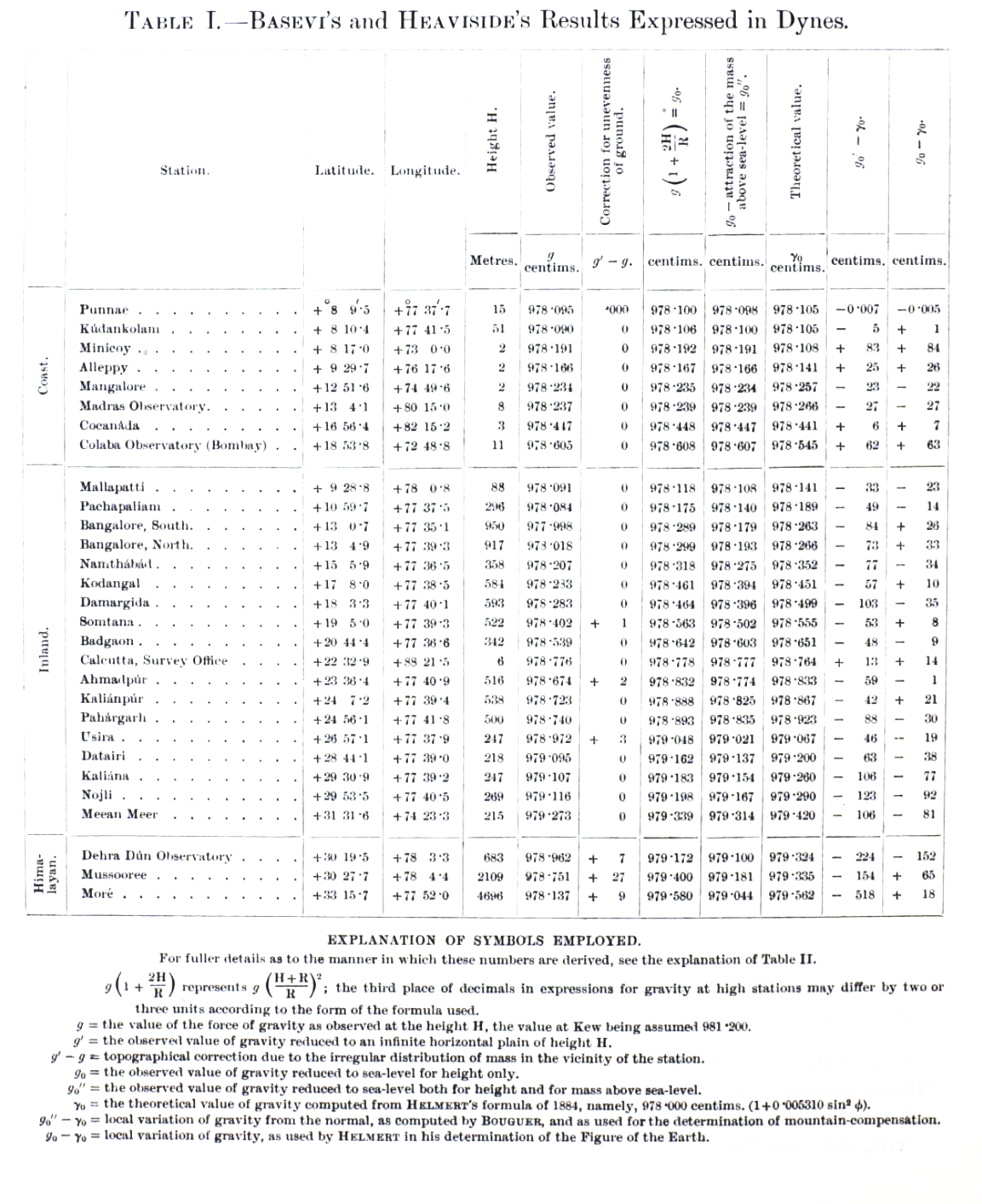

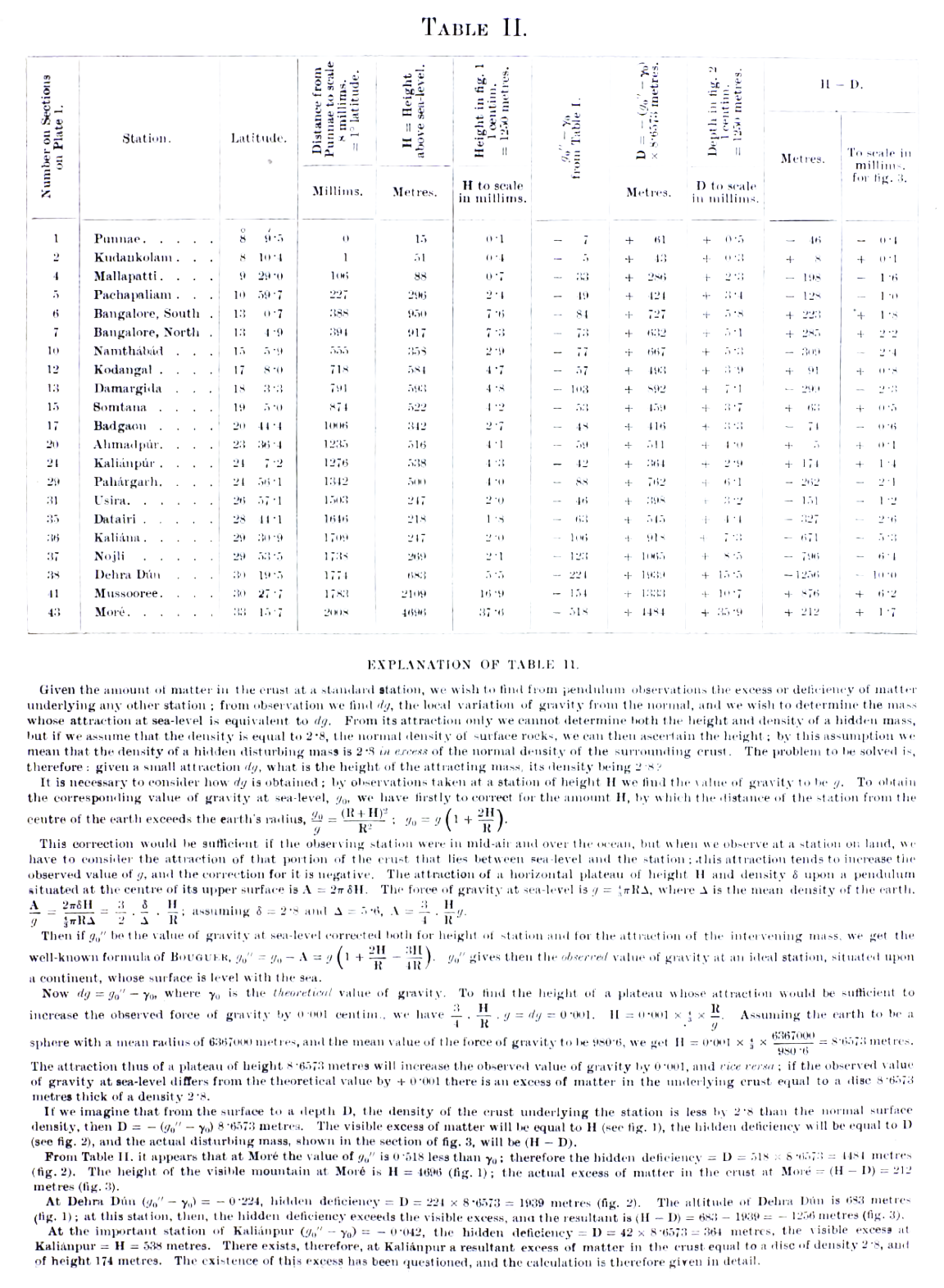

Basevi and William James Heaviside collected gravitational measurements at 31 stations between 1865 and 1873. He counted the number of oscillations of the standardized pendulum in a mean solar day and computations were made based on this. Sidney G. Burrard examined the data ad came up with ideas that would later have a bearing on the theories of isostasy, particularly those of J.H. Pratt.
