= Starhotels =

Chain of Italian inspired hotels

Starhotels S.p.A.
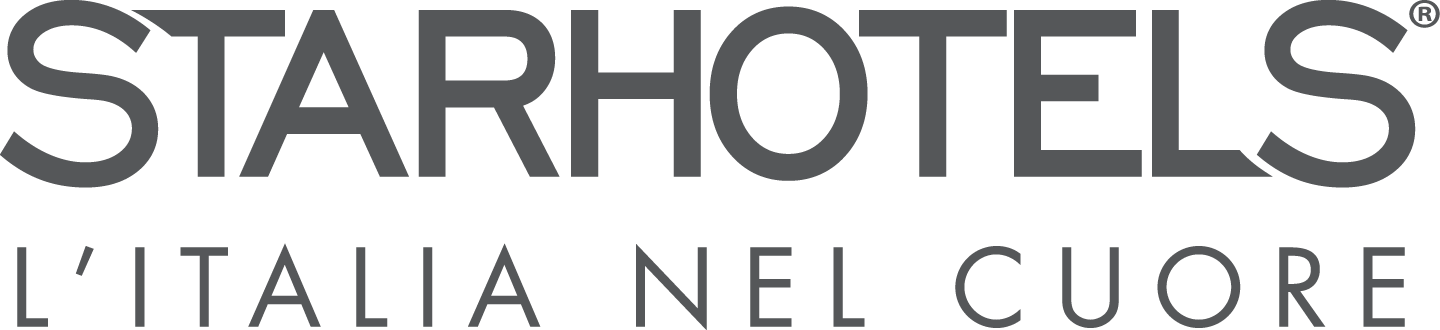
- Company type: Private
- Industry: Hospitality, Hotels, Tourism
- Founded: 1980 in Florence, Italy
- Headquarters: Florence, Italy
- Key people: Elisabetta Fabri (President & CEO)
- Products: Hotels
- Services: Management of Hotels
- Revenue: €500 million (2020)
- Website: www.starhotels.com

Starhotels is a privately owned hotel chain based in Florence that operates 30 luxury hotels (24 in Italy, three in London, and one each in Paris and New York City). Most of the hotels are four-star hotels with The Michelangelo (formerly the Hotel Taft) in New York City and Castille Paris being five star hotels.

== See also ==
- Castille Paris, Paris, France
- The Michelangelo, New York City
- Rosa Grand, Milan, Italy
- Savoia Excelsior Palace, Trieste, Italy
- Splendid Venice, Venice, Italy
- Starhotels Anderson, Milan, Italy
