= The Michelangelo =

Hotel in Manhattan, New York

The Taft Hotel Building
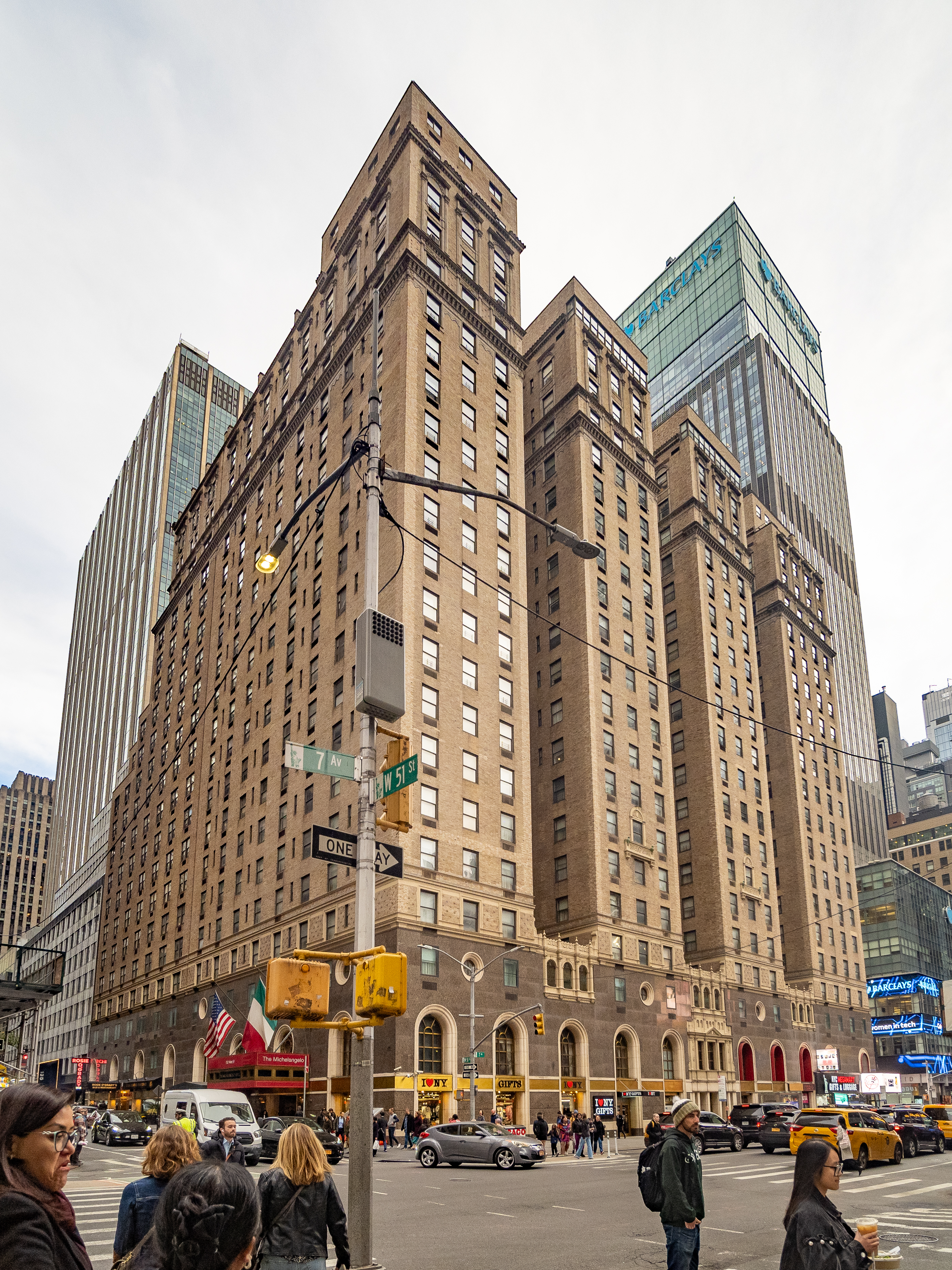
- The historic Taft Hotel building in 2024
- Interactive map of the The Taft Hotel Building area
- Hotel chain: Starhotels

General information
- Location: Manhattan, New York City, 152 West 51st Street
- Coordinates: 40°45′41″N 73°58′58″W
- Opening: 1926; 100 years ago
- Management: Starhotels

Height
- Height: 226 ft

Technical details
- Floor count: 22

Design and construction
- Architect: H. Craig Severance

Other information
- Number of rooms: 178

The Taft Hotel building is a 22-story pre-war Spanish Renaissance structure that occupies the eastern side of Seventh Avenue between 50th and 51st streets, just north of Times Square, in the Midtown Manhattan neighborhood of New York City. In its modern configuration, it features two separate portions with their own entrance on 51st Street. The larger portion is devoted to the residential condominium called Executive Plaza, with each of its 440 units being privately owned. Certain units are rented by their owners to the public. A smaller portion of the building contains The Michelangelo, a Starhotels hotel.

== History ==
=== Hotel Manger ===
On October 22, 1924, it was announced that Manger Hotels, owned by the Manger brothers, had purchased a block on Seventh Avenue between 50th and 51st streets from Realty Associates and Bing & Bing for approximately $5.5 million, after plans for a sports arena on that site fell through. H. Craig Severance was hired to design a 1,250 room hotel and Bing & Bing were named the general contractors for the project. The twenty-story, Spanish Renaissance-style Hotel Manager opened on November 15, 1926. At the time, the 2,250-room Manger was the largest hotel in the Times Square area, and the third largest in Manhattan. The development cost more than $10 million (equivalent to more than $182 million in 2025), an enormous amount of money at the time. The hotel was connected to the famous Roxy Theatre, a movie and stage show palace that opened a few months later, on March 11, 1927. The lobby of the Roxy was actually located in the 50th St and Seventh Avenue corner of the hotel structure. Madison Square Garden was a block to the west and drew thousands for major events.

=== Hotel Taft ===
In 1931, Manger Hotels sold the hotel to Bing & Bing, which renamed it the Hotel Taft, after President William Howard Taft. One of the hotel's most famous features was the Taft Grill. The George Hall Orchestra (sometimes called the George Hall Taft Hotel Orchestra) performed from the hotel on Monday through Saturday at noon on CBS Radio, starring Dolly Dawn. The band's signature song was "Love Letters in the Sand". Other big band performances were by Artie Shaw, Xavier Cugat, Tommy and Jimmy Dorsey, Glenn Miller, and Tony Pastor. Vincent Lopez performed in residency for 20 years and broadcast a radio show from the hotel, with Gloria Parker, Shake the Maracas. Lopez later broadcast a TV show from the Taft on the DuMont Television Network, Dinner Date, from January to July 1950.

In 1957, J.I. Lubin & Associates sold the hotel to Lawrence A. Wien. In 1958, Wien re-sold the hotel to Zeckendorf Hotels Corporation. In 1961, Zeckendorf re-sold the hotel to the Breitbart Corporation.

The 1960 demolition of the Roxy Theatre, the 1968 demolition of Madison Square Garden, the increasing presence of unsavory businesses in the area, and the desire for newer, more elegant hotels contributed to the gradual decay of the Taft Hotel. In 1974, Urban Renewal Housing and Development Corporation, headed by Gilbert M. Federbush, acquired the hotel from Lawrence A. Wien. At the time, the hotel was struggling with a 51% occupancy rate and losing $80,000 a month. A year later, the hotel fell into receivership and was foreclosed on by its lender, the Penn Mutual Life Insurance Company.

=== Mixed-use conversion ===
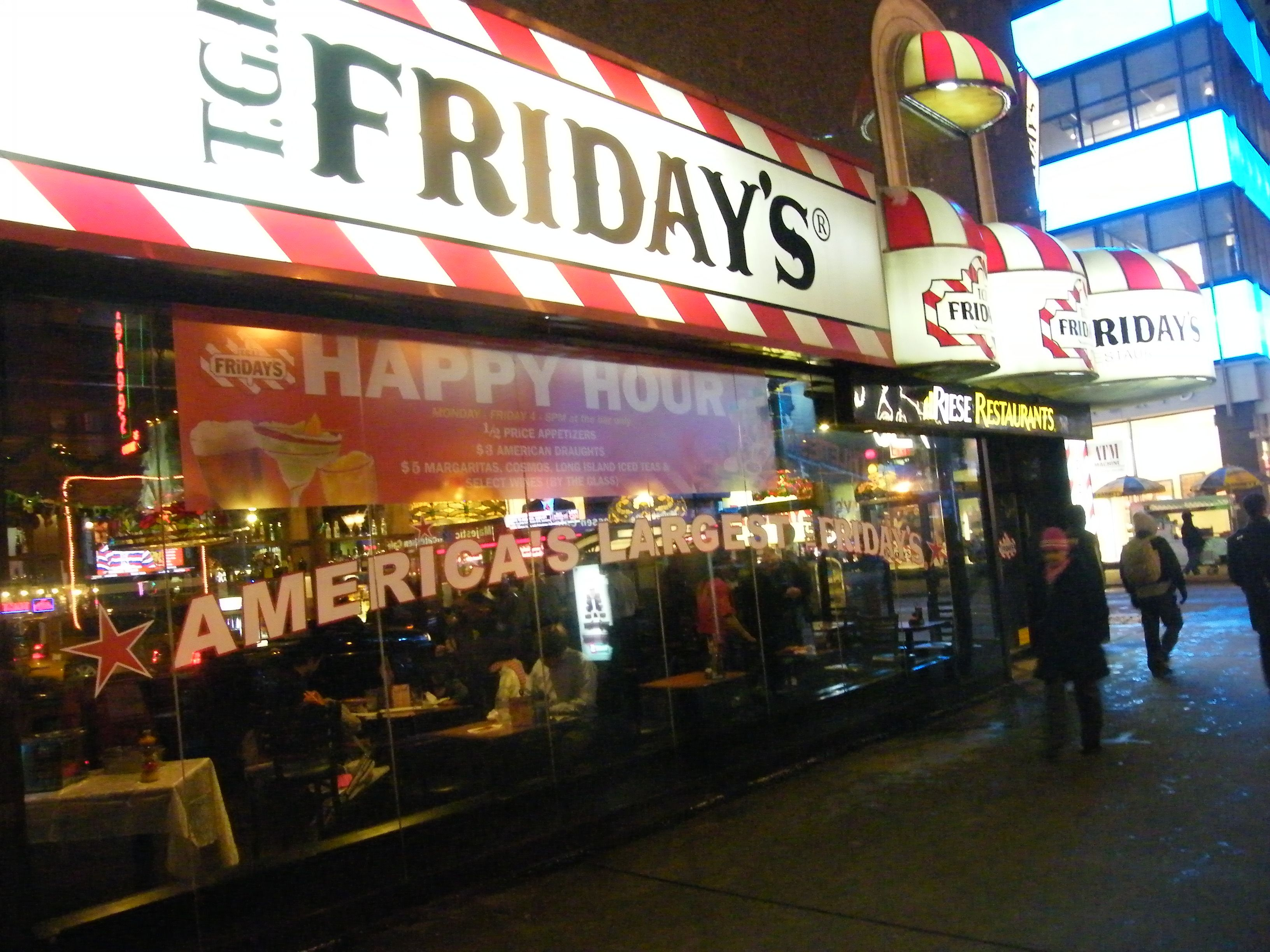
The T.G.I. Friday's formerly located in the space that once housed the Roxy Theatre's lobby

From 1984 to 1986, the hotel was converted to mixed use, at a cost of $100 million, buoyed by the economic recovery of the area, especially the 1983 announcement of the $200 million Equitable Center office tower, across 51st Street to the north.

Taft Partners Development Group, which converted the building, consisted of Steven Goodstein from the Goodstein Construction Company, Hank Sopher of J.I. Sopher & Company and Arthur Cohen, chairman of Arlen Realty and Development Corporation. The architect for the conversion was Wechsler-Grasso-Menziuso. The eighth through the 21st floors were rebuilt as 448 condominiums, known as Executive Plaza, while the first seven floors were occupied by the 179-room Grand Bay Hotel at Equitable Center, which opened in October 1986. The hotel and the condominiums had separate entrances side by side on 51st Street.

In 1990, Park Lane Hotels International acquired the hotel portion and renamed it the Parc Fifty One Hotel. In 1992, Starhotels acquired the hotel for $42 million and renamed it The Michelangelo. The Executive Plaza residential condominium portion of the building was listed in a 2015 New York Times article as having the highest proportion of non-primary residences of any building in Manhattan, at 74.4%. The building allows owners to rent out their apartments by the month, and most of the apartments are small – some under 400 square feet.

The building includes a Ruth's Chris Steakhouse on West 51st Street, and once contained America's largest T.G.I. Friday's restaurant, located in the space that once housed the lobby of the Roxy Theatre. The T.G.I. Friday's closed due to the effects of the COVID-19 pandemic.
