= George Basevi =

British architect (1794–1845)

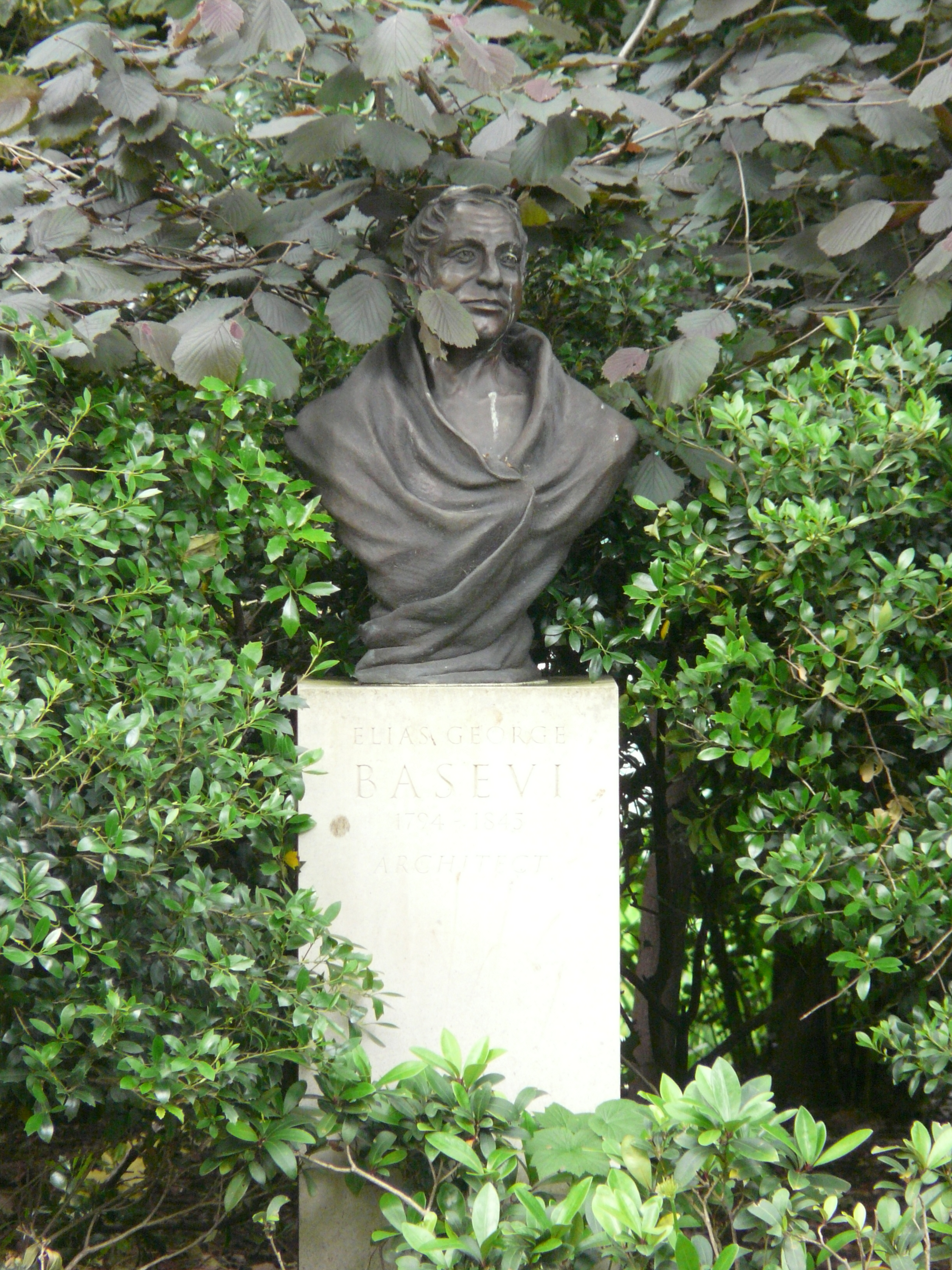
Bust of George Basevi (Belgrave Square Gardens)

Elias George Basevi FRS (1 April 1794 – 16 October 1845) was a British architect who worked in both Neoclassical and Gothic Revival styles. A pupil of Sir John Soane, his designs included Belgrave Square in London, and the Fitzwilliam Museum in Cambridge. He was surveyor to the Guardian Assurance Company, to the Trustees of Smith's Charity and to the Thurloe estate.

== Life ==
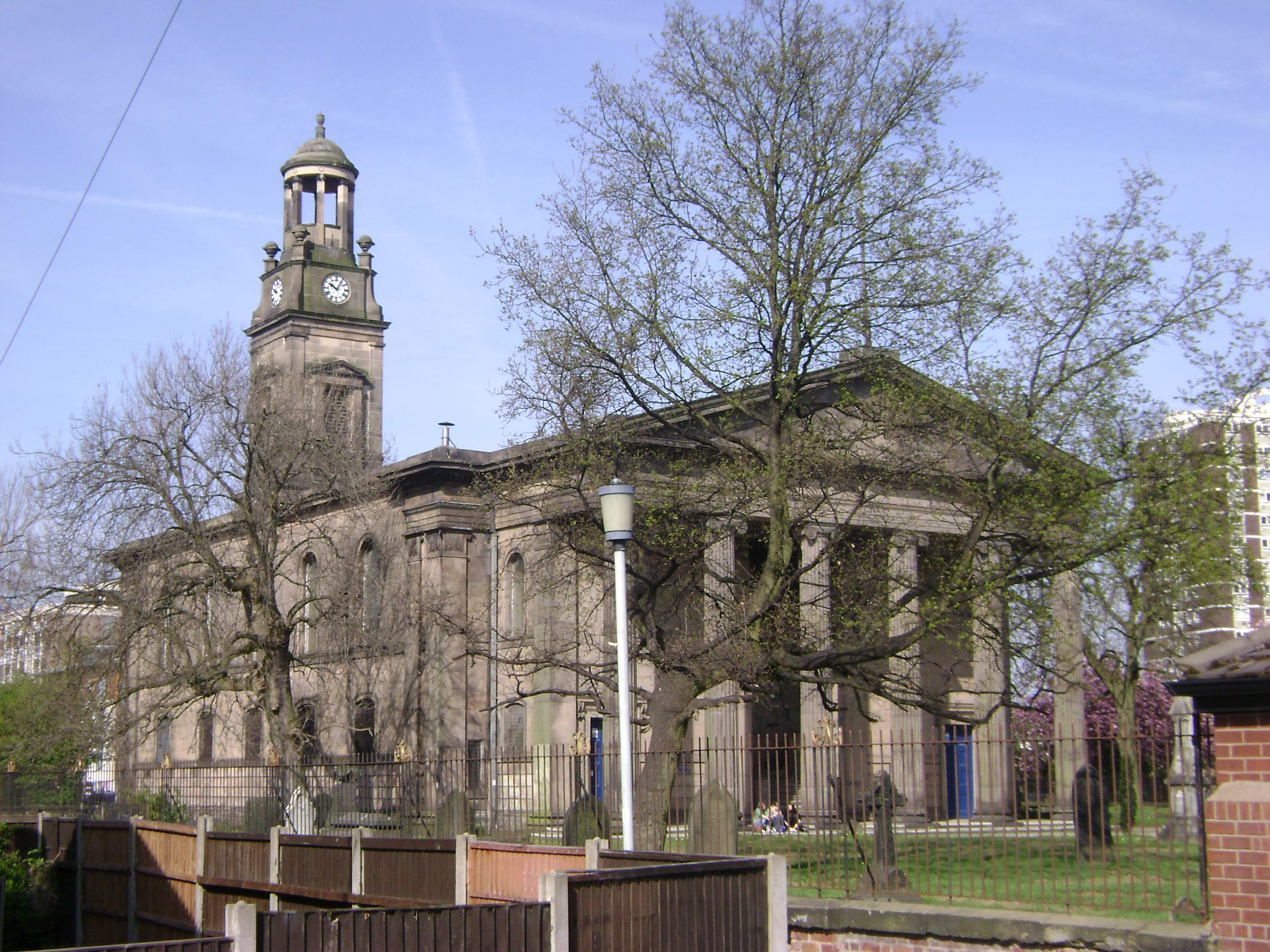
St Thomas' Church, Stockport

He was the youngest son of a City of London merchant, also named George Basevi. The family were of Sephardic Jewish origin, and Basevi's father remained a member of the congregation of the Bevis Marks Synagogue until 1817. Basevi was educated at the Reverend Dr Burney's school at Greenwich, and then trained professionally with John Soane, after which he spent three years studying in Greece and Rome. In 1821 he became the first surveyor of the Guardian Assurance Company, a post he held until his death. His work for the company involved personally inspecting and reporting on buildings where there was a great risk, or which were insured for large amounts. He also remodelled their premises in Lombard Street.

In 1822 he designed St Thomas' Church, Stockport and the next year, St Mary's, Greenwich. Both were for the Commissioners of the Church Building Act, and were in the neo-classical style. Basevi was unhappy with the modifications to the designs of the steeples imposed by the Commissioners, and he did no further work for them. St Mary's was demolished in 1936 after 17 years of closure.

He designed Belgrave Square for the developers William and George Haldimand; it was built between 1825 and 1841. Success there led to his appointment as Surveyor to the Trustees of Smith's Charity at Brompton, and to the adjoining Thurloe estate. At first his duties for the Smith's Charity estate were utilitarian, but in 1832 the bankruptcy of some tenant nurserymen freed eight acres for development, and between 1833 and 1845 he worked with the builder James Bonnin to develop Pelham Crescent, Pelham Place, part of Pelham Street and Egerton Crescent. He also designed the houses in Thurloe Square, off the Brompton Road, for the Thurloe estate.

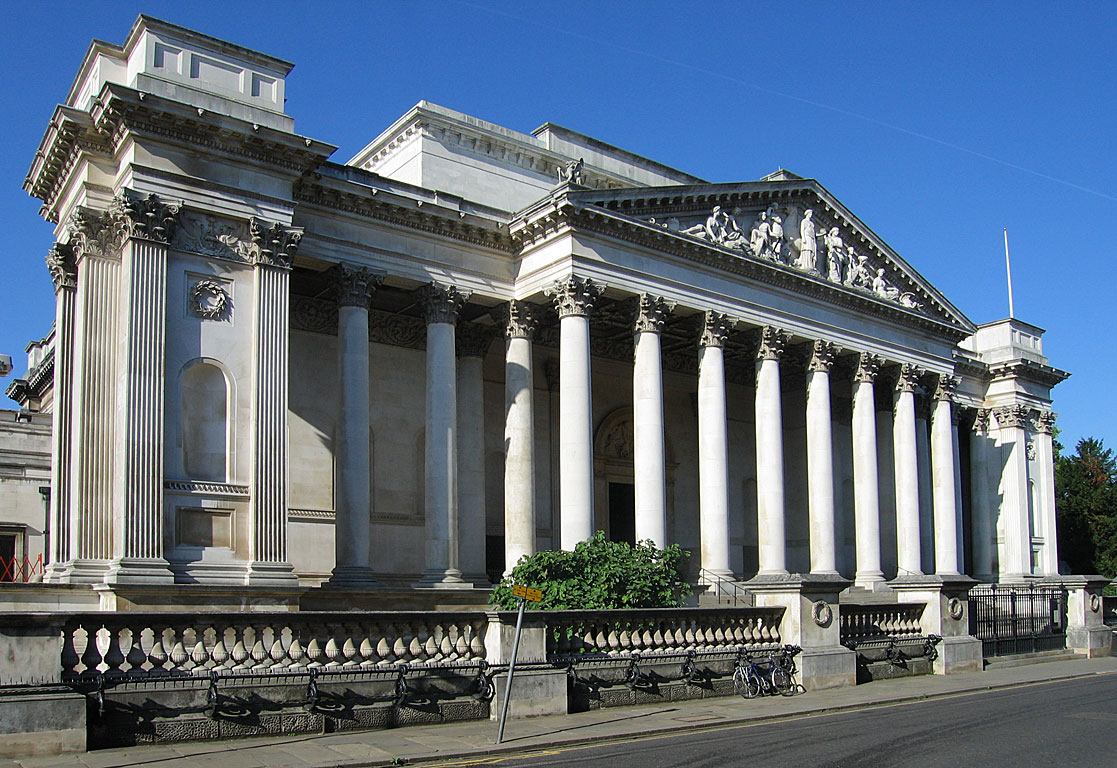
The main front of the Fitzwilliam Museum

In 1835 he won the competition to design a museum for Cambridge University, funded by a bequest from Viscount Fitzwilliam, with an imposing design in the Corinthian style. Work on the Fitzwilliam Museum was continued after Basevi's death by C. R. Cockerell.

Basevi built two Gothic churches in Chelsea, St Jude and St Saviour, and another, Holy Trinity at Twickenham Green. In 1834–6, he largely rebuilt the church of St Andrew, Hove, which had been in ruins since the collapse of its tower some years earlier. The church at Eye in Northamptonshire was also rebuilt to Basevi's designs; it was opened in 1847, two years after his death; a steeple was added in 1857. He also used the Gothic style at almshouses in Stamford and Ely, and at Coulsdon rectory, Surrey. He carried out some work for Balliol College, Oxford including a Gothic ceiling for the chapel, and was invited to design a whole new frontage for the college, but the plans were never carried out, due to the intervention of a faction amongst the fellows who commissioned an alternative set of plans from Pugin.

Other work included the stables at Bretton Hall in Yorkshire, Bywell Bridge in Northumberland, the Entrance Hall and Dining Room at Painswick House for his brother-in-law William Henry Hyett, and the remodelling of Gatcombe Park for the economist David Ricardo. In 1834 he made extensive alterations and additions to the Middlesex Hospital and later built a new medical school and operating theatre there. In 1834 he designed Beechwood House in Hampstead for his brother, Nathanial. He enlarged the prison at Ely and built a new one at Wisbech, In collaboration with Sidney Smirke he designed premises for the Conservative Club (1842–45), and the two architects were chosen to design a new building for the Carlton Club, but the scheme was delayed due to financial considerations.

Basevi became a Fellow of the Royal Society in 1843.

He died on 15 October 1845, aged 51, after falling through an opening in the floor of the old bell chamber of the west tower of Ely Cathedral while inspecting repairs. He was buried in the North Choir Aisle towards the east end of the cathedral under a monumental brass.

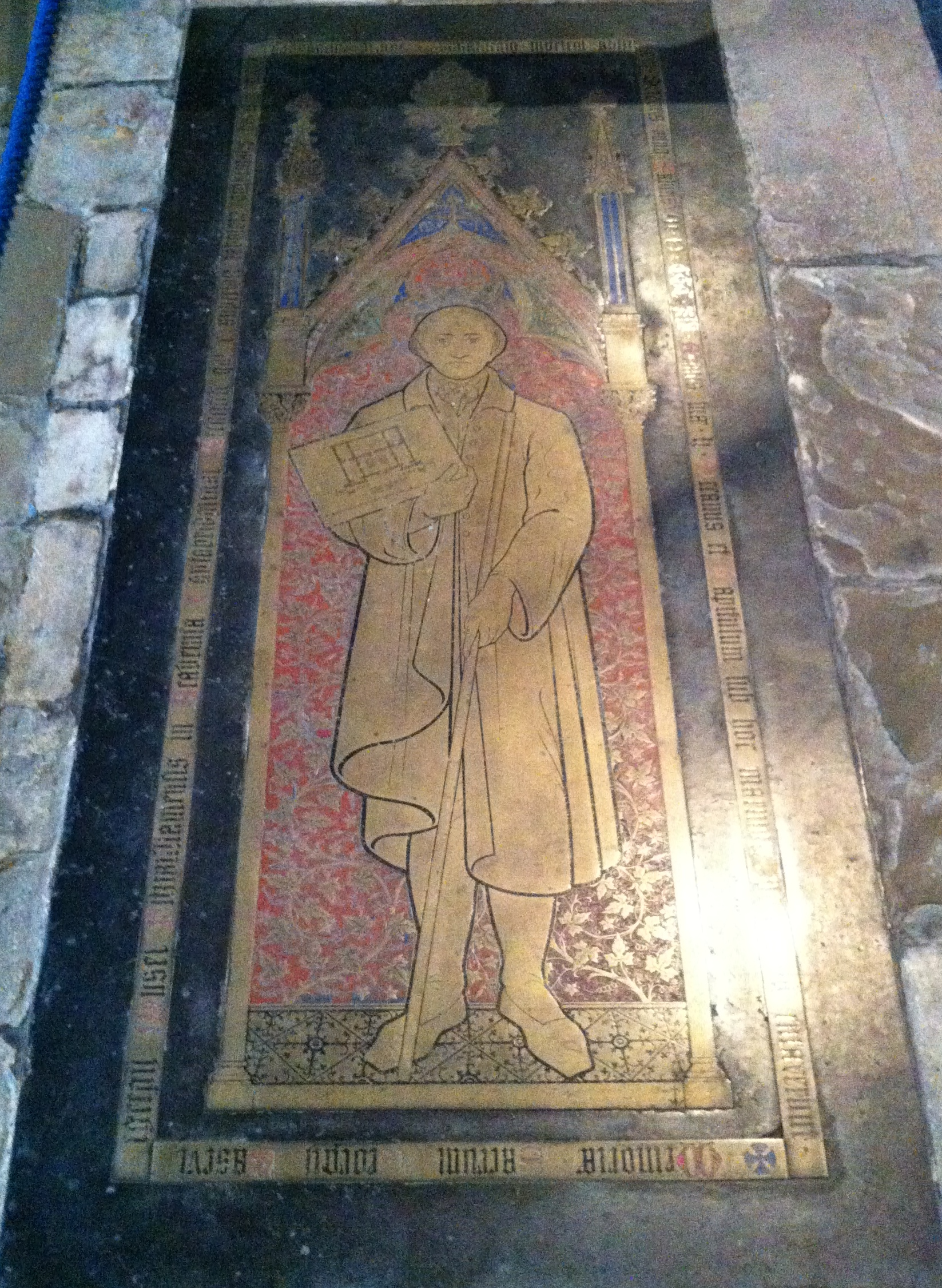
Grave of Basevi in Ely Cathedral

A London County Council blue plaque commemorates Basevi at 17 Savile Row in Mayfair.

Basevi's sons became army engineers. The older son George Henry became a colonel and later took an interest in microscopy. The younger, James Palladio Basevi became an army engineer who died in the Himalayas while conducting gravitational surveys.

== Sources ==
- Oxford Dictionary of National Biography
