= List of Iraqi artists =

The following is a list of important artists, including visual arts, poets and musicians, who were born in Iraq, active in Iraq or whose body of work is primarily concerned with Iraqi themes or subject matter.

Note: This article uses Arabic naming customs: the name "al" (which means 'from a certain place') or "ibn" or "ben" (which means 'son of') are not used for alphabetical indexing. Artists are listed alphabetically by their paternal family name. For example, the Iraqi artist Hashem Muhammad al-Baghdadi, is listed under "B" for Baghdadi, the paternal family name while the artist Zigi Ben-Haim, is listed under "H" for Haim.

== A ==
- Faraj Abbo (1921–1984), artist, theatre director, designer, author and educator
- Firyal Al-Adhamy (also known as Ferial al-Althami) (b. 1950) hurufiyya artist, calligrapher
- Kajal Ahmad (b. 1967), Kurdish-Iraqi poet
- Najiba Ahmad (b. 1954), poet
- Modhir Ahmed (born 1956), visual artist
- Sadik Kwaish Alfraji (b. 1960), multi-media artist, photographer, animator, video producer and installation artist
- Ahmed Albahrani (born 1965), sculptor and painter
- M.J. Alhabeeb (born 1954), calligrapher and painter
- Ayad Alkadhi (born 1971), visual artist
- Rheim Alkadhi (b. 1973), multidisciplinary artist
- Farid Allawerdi (1927-2007), Iraqi composer
- Sama Alshaibi (b. 1973), media and installation artist
- Usama Alshaibi (b. 1969), filmmaker and painter
- Jananne Al-Ani (b. 1966), Iraqi-Irish photographer and film-maker
- Latif al-Ani (b. 1932), photographer, known as the 'father of Iraqi photography'
- Zahroun Amara, world renowned Mandaean niello silversmith. People that are known to have owned his silver nielloware include Stanley Maude, Winston Churchill, Bahrain royal family, Egyptian King Farouk, Iraqi royal family including kings Faisal I and Ghazi, and British royal family including the Prince of Wales who became Edward VIII.
- Sinan Antoon (b. 1967), poet
- Layla Al-Attar (1944–1993), artist and painter
- Suad al-Attar (born 1942), painter
- Halla Ayla (born 1957), photographer, painter
- Apo Avedissian (b. 1990), filmmaker, painter, photographer, and writer
- Dia Azzawi (b. 1939), painter active in Iraq and London
- Fadhil Al Azzawi (born 1940), poet

== B ==
- Hashem Muhammad al-Baghdadi (1917–1973), calligrapher
- Niazi Mawlawi Baghdadi, 19th-century painter, decorator and calligrapher
- Ala Bashir (born 1939), painter, sculptor and plastic surgeon
- Basil Al Bayati (b. 1946), architect and designer
- Wafaa Bilal (b. 1966), performance artist, author and educator

== C ==
- Wasma'a Khalid Chorbachi (born 1944), Iraqi-American ceramist, calligrapher, painter
- Kamil Chadirji (1897–1968), photographer
- Rifa'at Chadirchi (1926–2020), architect

== D ==
- Issa Hanna Dabish (1919–2009), painter
- Murad al-Daghistani (1917–1984), photographer
- Salim al-Dabbagh (b. 1941), artist and print-maker
- Bassem Hamad al-Dawiri (died 2007), sculptor and artist
- Hafidh al-Droubi (1914–1991), painter and educator

== E ==
- Enheduanna, 23rd century BCE poet, wrote on Cuneiform tablets
- Ali Eyal (b. 1994), multi-media artist and painter
- Emma Laraby (b. 1990), visual arts educator, artist, graphic designer

== F ==
- Lisa Fattah (1941–1992), German-born painter, wife of Ismail Fatah al-Turk, active in Iraq
- Fuzûlî (Muhammad bin Suleyman), 15th century poet
- Mun'im Furat (1900–1972), sculptor

== H ==
- Abdulameer Yousef Habeeb (b. ?), calligrapher
- Mohammed Saeed Al-Habboubi (1849–1915), poet
- Zaha Hadid (1950–2016), Iraqi-British architect
- Asim Abdul Hafid (1886 - ?)
- Kadhim Hayder (alternatives: Kazem Haider, Kadhim Haydar) (1932–1985), artist, poet, author, stage-set designer, educator
- Zigi Ben-Haim (b. 1945), sculptor and painter
- Mansur Al-Hallaj, 9th century Sufi poet and mystic
- Jamil Hamoudi, (1924–2003), sculptor, painter and author
- Choman Hardi (born 1974), poet, translator and painter
- Faeq Hassan (1914–1990), painter
- Mohammed Ghani Hikmat (1929–2011), sculptor

== J ==
- Jabra Ibrahim Jabra (1920–1994), painter, art historian, art critic and author
- Khalid al-Jader (1922–1988), painter, educator, art historian and author
- Muhammad Mahdi Al-Jawahiri (1899–1997), poet
- Koutaiba Al Janabi (?-?), film-maker and photographer
- Amal al-Jubouri (b. 1967), poet
- Jamal Jumá, poet
- Saleh al-Jumai'e (b. 1939), contemporary artist

== K ==
- Nida Kadhim (b. 1937), sculptor
- Hayv Kahraman (born 1981), painter and sculptor
- Farouk Kaspaules (born ?), artist
- Hashim al-Khattat, "Hashim the Calligrapher," (1917–1973), calligrapher, considered as the last of the classical calligraphers
- Rachel Khedoori (born 1964), Australian-born artist of Iraqi heritage (twin sister of Toba Khedoori)
- Toba Khedoori (born 1964), Australian-born artist of Iraqi heritage, known primarily for highly detailed mixed-media paintings (twin sister of Rachel Khedoori)
- Paulus Khofri (1923–2000), composer, lyricist and painter
- Nedim Kufi (b. 1966), multi-disciplinary visual artist and graphic designer

== M ==
- Muhammad Hasan Abi al-Mahasin, poet
- Alaa Al-Marjani (b. 1967), photographer from Najaf city, worked with AP and Reuters.
- Mohamed Makiya (1914–2015), modernist architect and patron of the arts
- Hanaa Malallah (b. 1958), painter
- Hassan Massoudy (b. 1944), painter and calligrapher
- Ahmed Matar (b. 1954), poet
- Dunya Mikhail (b. 1965), poet
- Ghassan Muhsen (born 1945), artist, painter and ambassador
- Ibn Muqla (885/6–940), 10th-century calligrapher

== N ==
- Yuhana Nashmi, Mandaean visual artist and ceramicist based in Australia
- Rafa al-Nasiri (1940–2013), painter, print-maker, educator and author
- Muzaffar Al-Nawab (b. 1934), poet, critic and painter
- Abū Nuwās al-Ḥasan ibn Hānī al-Ḥakamī, 9th century Iraqi poet
- Farah Nosh, photographer and photo-journalist

== O ==
- Amer al-Obaidi (b. 1943), painter
- Mahmoud Obaidi (b. 1966), painter, conceptual artist, sculptor, film-maker
- Madiha Omar (1908–2005), pioneer of the Hurufiyya movement
- Widad Al-Orfali (b. 1929), artist and musician

== P ==
- Fred Parhad (b. 1947), sculptor

== Q ==
- Qais Al-Sindy (b. 1967), artist and painter

== R ==
- Husain al-Radi (1924–1963), politician, poet, and painter
- Nuha al-Radi (1941–2004), diarist, ceramicist, painter
- Khaled al-Rahal (1926-1987), sculptor and painter
- Nadhim Ramzi (1928–2013), artist and graphic designer
- Ibrahim Rashid (born 1957), multidisciplinary artist
- Abdul Qadir Al Rassam (1882–1952), painter
- Wafaa Abed Al Razzaq (b. 1952), poet

== S ==
- Miran al-Saadi (b. 1934) sculptor
- Mahmoud Sabri (1927–2012), painter
- Jamil Sidqi al-Zahawi (1863–1936), poet, educator and activist
- Ahmed Al Safi (born 1971), sculptor
- Shakir Hassan Al Said (1925–2004), painter, art historian, art critic, educator and prolific author
- Issam al-Said (1938–1988), painter, print-maker, designer, etcher, architect, philosopher and author
- Muhammad Sa'id al-Sakkar
- Jawad Saleem (also given as Jawed Salim or Joad Salim) (1920–1961), sculptor
- Su'ad Salim (b. 1918)
- Tamara Salman, 20th century designer
- Lorna Selim (1928–2012), artist and English-born wife of Jawad Saleem
- Naziha Salim (1927–2008), artist and painter (sister of Jawad Saleem)
- Mohammed Hajji Selim (1883–1941), painter, father of Suad Salim, Jawad Saleem, Naziha Salim and Nizarre Selim
- Badr Shakir al-Sayyab (1926–1964), poet
- Andy Shallal (born 1969), artist and activist
- Naseer Shamma (b. 1963), musician and singer
- Muhannad Al-Shawi (b. 1974), poet
- Walid Siti (b. 1954)
- Vian Sora (born 1976), painter

== T ==
- Ali Talib (b. 1944), painter
- Aatqall Taúaa (b. ?), sculptor and author
- Ismail Fatah Al Turk (1934–2004), painter and sculptor

== W ==
- Yahya Al-Wasiti, 13th century illustrator

== Y ==
- Nazar Yahya (b. 1963), Iraqi-American etcher, sculptor (in metal), installation artist and photographer
- Saadi Yousef (b. 1934, near Basra), poet, author and journalist
- Yaqut al-Musta'simi 13th-century calligrapher

== Z ==
- Khalil al-Zahawi (1946–2007), calligrapher
- Muqbil Al-Zahawi (b. 1935), ceramicist
- Salim Mohammed Saleh Zaki painter
- Haifa Zangana (born 1950), novelist, author and artist

== See also ==
- Baghdad School
- Hurufiyya movement
- Iraqi art
- Islamic art
- Islamic architecture
- Islamic calligraphy
- List of Iraqi women artists

Major Iraqi public artworks

- Al-Shaheed Monument. Baghdad
- The Monument to the Unknown Soldier, Baghdad
- Victory Arch, Baghdad
