= Shereen Audi =

Jordanian artist

- Born: December 8, 1970 (age 55); Amman, Jordan
- Education: Institute of Fine Arts, Jordan
- Known for: Painting, Mixed Media, Photography and Video Art
- Movement: Contemporary Art

Shereen Audi (Arabic: شيرين عودة) (born 1970 in Amman) is a Jordanian visual artist.

== Biography ==
Shereen Audi graduated from the Institute of Fine Arts in Amman in 1992. She continued her studies at the Jordan National Gallery of Fine Arts Print Workshop and the Darat al Funun Summer Academy, focusing on art and printmaking. During her time there, she collaborated with various artists, including Khaled Khries, Nedim Kufi, Mahmoud Obaidi, and Lynne Allen.

Following her graduation from the Institute of Fine Arts, Audi began showcasing her work in exhibitions. At the beginning of her career, she primarily focused on painting. However, as time progressed, she ventured into exploring mixed media, video art and photography.

Audi advocates equality and full rights for women so that they can achieve their full creative potential. The themes of women and female identity frequently appear in her work.

In her work, she uses various media, including acrylic paint, photography and video art. Audi favours red, black and white in her art. Besides at least ten solo shows, she has participated in group exhibitions in Germany, Bahrain, Lebanon, Algeria, Egypt, and Jordan. In her 10th solo show, Dreams Give Hope, she exhibited collages. In Wall Street International, Rawan Al Adwan described Audi's work as "characterized by simplicity in applying the colors on the canvas without mixing them, an altered perspective including longitudinal and cross lines." Audi has cited Joan Miró, Pablo Picasso, Jackson Pollock, Franz Kline, Robert Motherwell, Andy Warhol, and Arab contemporary artists as among her influences.

Audi currently resides in Amman.

== Exhibitions ==
Her artwork is featured in numerous private collections and public institutions, notably the Jordan National Gallery of Fine Arts. She has conducted numerous solo exhibitions and contributed to various group shows across the Middle East, Europe, and Asia, spanning countries such as Germany, Japan, Romania, Finland, Bahrain, Lebanon, Algeria, Egypt, and Jordan.

=== Solo exhibitions ===
- 1995 Rawaq Albalka Art Gallery – Amman
- 1996 Jordanian Plastic Artists Association – Amman
- 1999 The French Cultural Center – Amman
- 2000 Blue Fig Café – Amman
- 2002 Blue Fig Café – Amman

=== Group exhibitions ===
- 1993 Young Artists Group – Housing Bank Gallery – Amman
- 1995 Celebration on the occasion of the opening of the new center of Jordanian Plastic Artists Association – Amman
- 1995 Arabic watercolor paintings – Orfali Art Gallery – Amman
- 1995 Jerash festival Zeious Art Gallery – Amman
- 1996 First Collective exhibition of graphic from Darat AL-funun print making Studio Amman
- 1996 Collective Exhibition of Jordanian Modern Art – Spanish Cultural Center (Cervantes Institute) – Amman
- 1996 Collective Exhibition of Modern Art – Bonn Germany
- 1996 Summer Festival – Drat Al- Funun Art Center – Amman
- 1996 Group Exhibition Graphics – Egypt
- 1996 Three Female Artists by the Women Association – Royal Cultural Center – Amman
- 1997 Jordanian Artists – Fakher Al-Nissa Zaid Gallery – Amman
- 1998 Spring Festival – Amman Municipality
- 1999 Arrar – Royal Cultural Center – Amman
- 2000 Woman’s Day – Amman Municipality
- 2000 Jordanian Artists – Cultural Week - Royal Cultural Center – Amman
- 2001 Jordanian Cultural Week – Maghreb
- 2001 Jordanian Artists - Amman Municipality
- 2001 Three Female Artists – Rodin Art Gallery – Amman
- 2001 Jordanian Artists – Zara Gallery – Grand Hayatt – Amman
- 2001 Group of Artists – Orfalli Art Gallery – Amman
- 2001 Female Artists – UNESCO – Beirut
- 2001 Bangladesh Pinalei – Bangladesh
- 2002 Jordanian Artists – Zara Gallery – Grand Hayatt – Amman
- 2002 Jordanian Artists – 4 walls Gallery – Sheraton – Amman
- 2002 Spring Festival – Amman Municipality
- 2002 Jordanian Artists – Positive and Negative – Institute Cervantes – Amman
- 2003 Jordanian Artists – HUES – National Gallery – Amman
- 2003 Jordanian Artists – Zara Gallery - Grand Hayatt – Amman
- 2003 Jordanian Artists - Jordanian Plastic Art Association – Amman
- 2003 Jordanian Artists – Sheraton – American Embassy – Amman
