= Jader =

Jader may refer to:

== People ==
=== Given name ===
- Jader Barbalho (born 1944), Brazilian politician and businessman
- Jader Bignamini (born 1976), Italian conductor and clarinetist
- Jader Souza (born 1982), Brazilian swimmer
- Jader (footballer, born 1984), Jader da Silva Brazeiro, Brazilian football midfielder
- Jáder Obrian (born 1995), Colombian football attacking midfielder
- Jader Valencia (born 1999), Colombian football forward
- Jader (footballer, born 2003), Jader Barbosa da Silva Gentil, Brazilian football forward

=== Surname ===
- Khalid al-Jader (1922-1988), Iraqi artist, administrator and author
- Bernard Jąder (born 1951), Polish speedway rider
- Stig Jäder (born 1954), Swedish cross country skier

== Places ==
- Jäder Church, Swedish church
