= Niazi Mawlawi Baghdadi =

Iraqi painter (19th century)

Niazi Mawlawi Baghdadi, also given as Nazayi Mulawi Baghdadi (Arabic: نيازي مولوي البغدادي), was a 19th century Iraqi painter, decorator and calligrapher, regarded as the first Iraqi artist to combine traditional practices within a modern style of art.

== Life and career ==
Virtually nothing is known of Niazi Mawlawi Baghdadi's early life. In 19th-century Iraq, mural painters were generally seen as artisans rather than artists and the distinction between artists and artists was not well defined. Muralists rarely signed their work, allowing their contributions to be forgotten with the passage of time. Only a few named individuals from this period are known, including the painter, Abbud 'the Jewish' Naqqash and the calligrapher, painter and decorator; Hashem al-Khattat ("Hashim, the Calligrapher", early 20th-century) and Niazi Mawlawi Baghdadi, but relatively few details of their lives and careers are known.

His name, "Baghdadi" suggests that he was either born or grew up in Baghdad. Details of his active career as an artist are sketchy and very little has been written about him. It was not until the artist, intellectual and art historian, Shakir Hassan Al Said wrote a revisionist history of Iraqi arts that the significance of the artist was revealed. Said provided evidence that Baghdadi was the earliest Iraqi artist to combine the Eastern tradition of miniature art with Western art methods, thereby predating the modern Iraq art movement by almost a century.

He was a Sufi (Muslim mystic) of the Mawlawi order, who was a master calligrapher in the Persian tradition. He was active from at least the 1840s when he and his contemporaries produced a number of wall murals for the interior walls of the Musiory Baghdad as well as for buildings in Basra and Sulaymaniyah. These works were often inspired by Iraqi folk heritage.

He painted miniatures in both watercolor and oil. These works synthesise text, ornamentation, and painting in ways that had not been done previously. Although he was influenced by the character of traditional manuscripts, he was able to circumvent the strict rules associated with classical calligraphy, and employed modern graphic techniques. He was "an artist ahead of his time...[who possessed] a bold vision that was achieved by other Iraqi and Arab artists only in the second half of the twentieth century."

== Work ==
His work is held in the National Gallery of Baghdad.

== See also ==
- Iraqi art
- Islamic art
- Islamic calligraphy
- List of Iraqi artists
