= Murad al-Daghistani =

Iraqi photographer (1917–1984)

- مراد الداغستاني
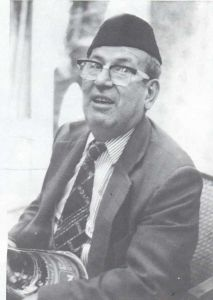
- Born: Moussali Mourad Al-Daghistani; 1917; Mosul, Iraq
- Died: 27 July 1984 (aged 66–67); Iraq
- Known for: Photographer
- Website: Murad al-Daghestani via Al-Hasso Gallery

Murad al-Daghistani, Murad Ajamat (Kumyk: Murat Acamat, 1917–1984) was a pioneering Iraqi photographer of Kumyk descent. who was active in Mosul from the mid-1930s, and later worked in Baghdad. He achieved international recognition for the quality of his photographs which recorded scenes of every-day life and people.

== Life and career ==
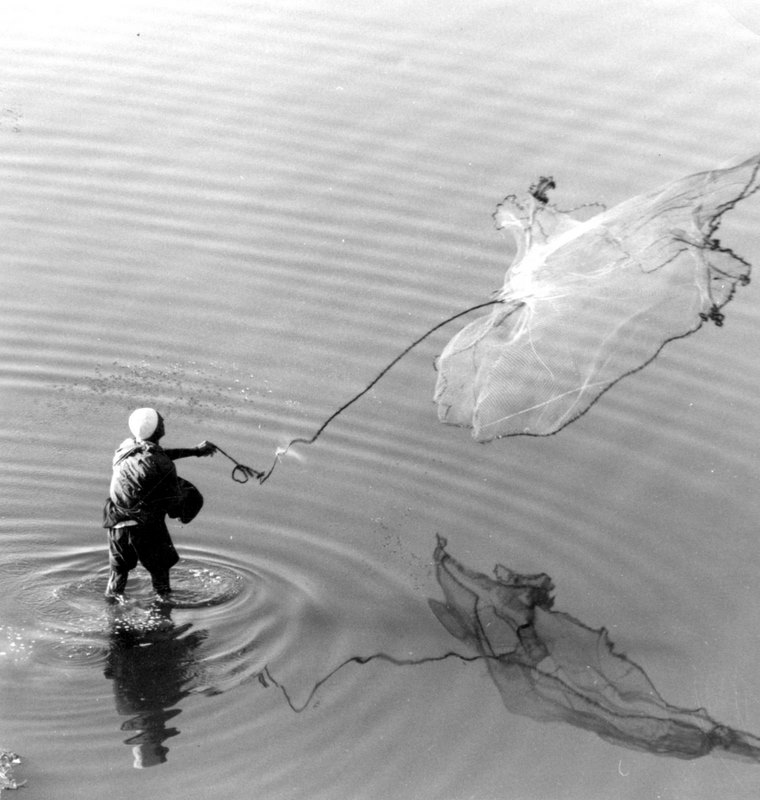
Casting the Net photograph by Murad Daghistani, 1930s

Murad al-Daghistani was born in 1917 in Mosul, Iraq. His father was Abdul-Hamit Ajamat, a Kumyk engineer who participated in building the Iraqi railroad.

It is not clear how Dagestani was exposed to early photography. Mosul was a city that had an established photography and film-making industry dating to the late 19th century. Local men were using cameras to assist archeologists from around 1895. Following the First World War, a photographer named Tartaran, set up a studio at the entrance to the Mosul Elementary School. It is possible that Dagestani observed the photographer at work during his school years. Even before he had graduated from high school, he had picked up the camera. By 1935, he had established himself as a talented photographer.

His studio and photography shop, situated in Al-Dawasah Street, Mosul (opposite the Sinal Atlas) was simply called Murad Photographer.

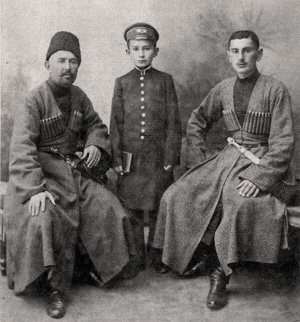
The family of a pioneering Iraqi photographer Murad ad-Dagestani. (From left) Grandfather Hasay, father, Abdul-Hamit, Hasay's cousin, Alimpasha

For subject matter, he drew on the street life and industry in and around the city of Mosul, especially life along the Tigris river. He always carried his camera, ready to capture a moment or event. At sunrise, he could be found at the riverside, where he loved to watch fishing boats and attempted to capture the fisherman at work. In his studio, he produced more creative portraits of dervishes, tribal men and everyday people.

He influenced a number of younger photographers, including Hadi Al Najjar (b. 1957) and Mahmoud Saeed. The artist and photographer, Mahmoud Saeed, recalled that, as a youth, he loved to watch gifted photographers, especially al-Daghistani, as he photographed every day scenes around Mosul and how he "immortalized a fishing net as it filled the air before falling to the river, or a cart travelling a muddy road, memorable faces of dervishes, of aged men and women, and of active children."

He was a very heavy smoker and had one lung removed in the 1970s, after which he lived another ten years. He died on 27 July 1984.

== Work ==
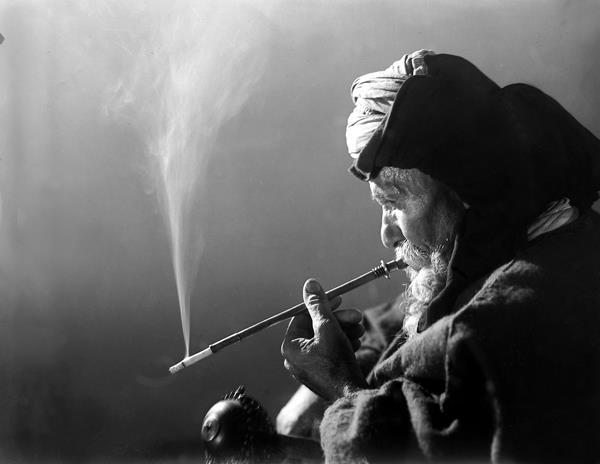
The Smoker, photograph by Murad Daghistani, 1930s

He was a realist; his photographs which were primarily in black and white, captured fleeting moments of human endeavour. For this ability to capture a frozen moment in time, he was called the "sniper photographer". He was awarded the Certificate of Creativity from Brazil and was just one of eight artists in the world to receive this award for the portrayal of situations and movements of people that may not recur again.

He participated in more than eighty international exhibitions in Europe and the Americas, including the Man and Sea Exhibition (Yugoslavia, 1965) and Presenting a Hundred International Pictures (Germany)

His photos appeared in numerous international magazines, including the magazine, Photographic Photography as well as many English, Iraqi and Arabic magazines. Examples of his work are held in the archive of the Arab Image Foundation (AIR).

His most well-known and widely reproduced photographs are:

- The Old Man
- Sousou the Dancer and the Snake Baghdad, 1930
- The Smoker, 1930s (pictured)
- Fishing, 1930s
- River Crossing, 1930s
- Boats
- Clay Work
- Waiting
- Casting the Net 1930s (pictured)

== Legacy ==
He is the subject of a book, Murad Al-Dagestani: The Dialectic of Man and Nature, written by Professor Najman Yassin and published in Baghdad in 1985.

== See also ==
- History of photography
- Iraqi art
- List of Iraqi artists
