= Ayad Alkadhi =

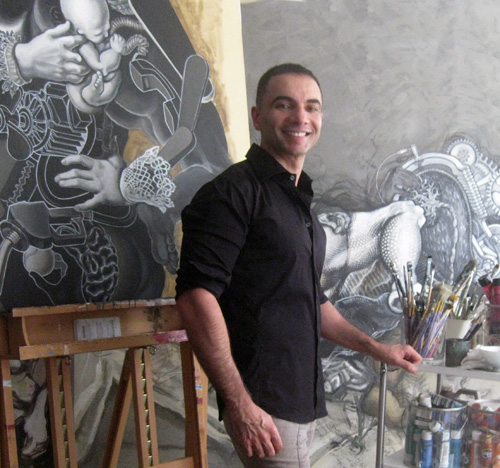
- Ayad Alkadhi in his New York studio
- Born: اياد القاضي; 1971 (age 54–55); Baghdad, Iraq
- Education: New York University, Tisch School of the Arts
- Known for: Painter

Ayad Alkadhi (Arabic: اياد القاضي; born 1971), is a New York Based, Iraqi born artist. Alkadhi's work focuses on the intersection of Near Eastern and Western culture, politics and religion. Arabic calligraphy and Middle Eastern references define much of his work.

== Life ==
Born and raised in Baghdad, Iraq, Alkadhi left Iraq after the first Gulf War. He moved to the United States in 2000. Alkadhi graduated with an MFA from New York University Tisch School of the Arts. He currently resides and works in New York City.

Alkadhi's best known works are:

1: “I am Baghdad” series (2008- 2015). This series references the topic of post occupation Iraq and the emotional struggle of the Iraqi people. http://aalkadhi.com/content/baghdad_ss/

2: “If Words Could Kill) series (2012- 2015). This series is inspired by the traditional art of the. In these works, the written word assumes the shape of a sword, dagger, gun. The topic of this series is the power of words and their impact on self and others.http://aalkadhi.com/content/if%20_words_could_kill/

3: “Umbilical” series (2012). This series references the Arab Spring.http://aalkadhi.com/content/umbilical/

Alkadhi's work has been exhibited at the Honolulu Museum of Art, Nasher Museum of Art, University of Michigan Museum of Art, Nevada Museum of Art, Los Angeles Municipal Art Gallery, Queens Museum of Art, Herbert Johnson Museum, the Austrian Cultural forum, Station Museum of Contemporary Art and New York University's Bronfman's Centre; the Station Museum of Contemporary Art in Houston, Texas; the European Parliament in Brussels. Contemporary Art in the Middle East, a book published by Black Dog Publishing, also features his work.

== See also ==
- Iraqi art
- Islamic art
- List of Iraqi artists
