= Ala Bashir =

Iraqi painter, sculptor and plastic surgeon

- علاء بشير
- Born: Iraq
- Education: Royal College of Surgeons in Edinburgh
- Known for: Painter, sculptor and plastic-surgeon

Ala Bashir (Arabic: علاء بشير) is an Iraqi painter, sculptor and plastic surgeon who has exhibited widely and is noted for his portrayals of the human condition.

== Biography ==
Ala Bashir was born into a Shiite family of the Jubouri tribe, though he would later renounce sectarianism and tribal affiliations. As a cosmetic surgeon, Bashir claims to have been the first in the Middle East to successfully complete hand replantation surgery. This, in addition to his uniquely surrealist painting and sculpture in an Iraqi art scene focused on the nationalist and heroic, won Bashir the notice of dictator Saddam Hussein. Dr. Bashir would go on to be President Hussein's personal physician and have uncommon access to Hussein in more unguarded and intimate moments. Following the fall of the Baathist government, Bashir worked with the CIA to secure the surrender of high-ranking regime officials.

== Work ==
His works of art have been shown in several international exhibitions in, for example, France (Paris, Cagnes-sur-Mer), the United Kingdom (London), Ireland (Dublin), Austria (Vienna), Germany (Bonn), Yugoslavia (Belgrade), Italy (Rome), Russia (Moscow), Qatar (Doha), Morocco (Rabat), Libya (Tripoli), India (New Delhi), Tunisia (Tunis), Egypt (Cairo), the United States (New York, 1976 American tour), Iraq (Baghdad) and currently at the American Visionary Art Museum in Baltimore-USA. Ala Bashir earned many national and international awards, among which are the Gold Medal in the Biennale International Exhibition in Baghdad in 1988, the second prize in the International Poster Exhibition in Paris in 1983 and Iraq's highest State Award for Fine Art in 2003.

Bashir designed two historically important monuments in Baghdad: "The Union", a statue (73 feet high, made of stone, weighing 970 tons), depicting the love between man and woman. This monument was destroyed by the Iraqi Authority in February 2010. The other is "The Cry", a statue (27 feet high, made of bronze) depicting the tragedy of the Amiyria shelter, where 400 women and children were killed by an air strike in February 1991 during the First Gulf War—the monument is located close to the shelter.

== See also ==
- Iraqi art
- Islamic art
- List of Iraqi artists
1. https://www.azzaman.com/المنقذ-برؤى-التشكيلي-علاء-بشير/
2. https://www.azzaman.com/العشاء-الأخير-لعلاء-بشير-معرض-يتجاوز-س/
3. https://www.majalla.com/node/322473/ثقافة-ومجتمع/الفنان-التشكيلي-علاء-بشير-إنساني-بضراوة
4. https://www.alarabiya.net/culture-and-art/2024/09/16/الفنان-التشكيلي-والطبيب-د-علاء-بشير-والمساومة-القاسية-
5. https://www.alquds.co.uk/البعد-الفلسفي-للإنسان-في-أعمال-العراق/
