= Nazar Yahya =

Iraqi-born artist

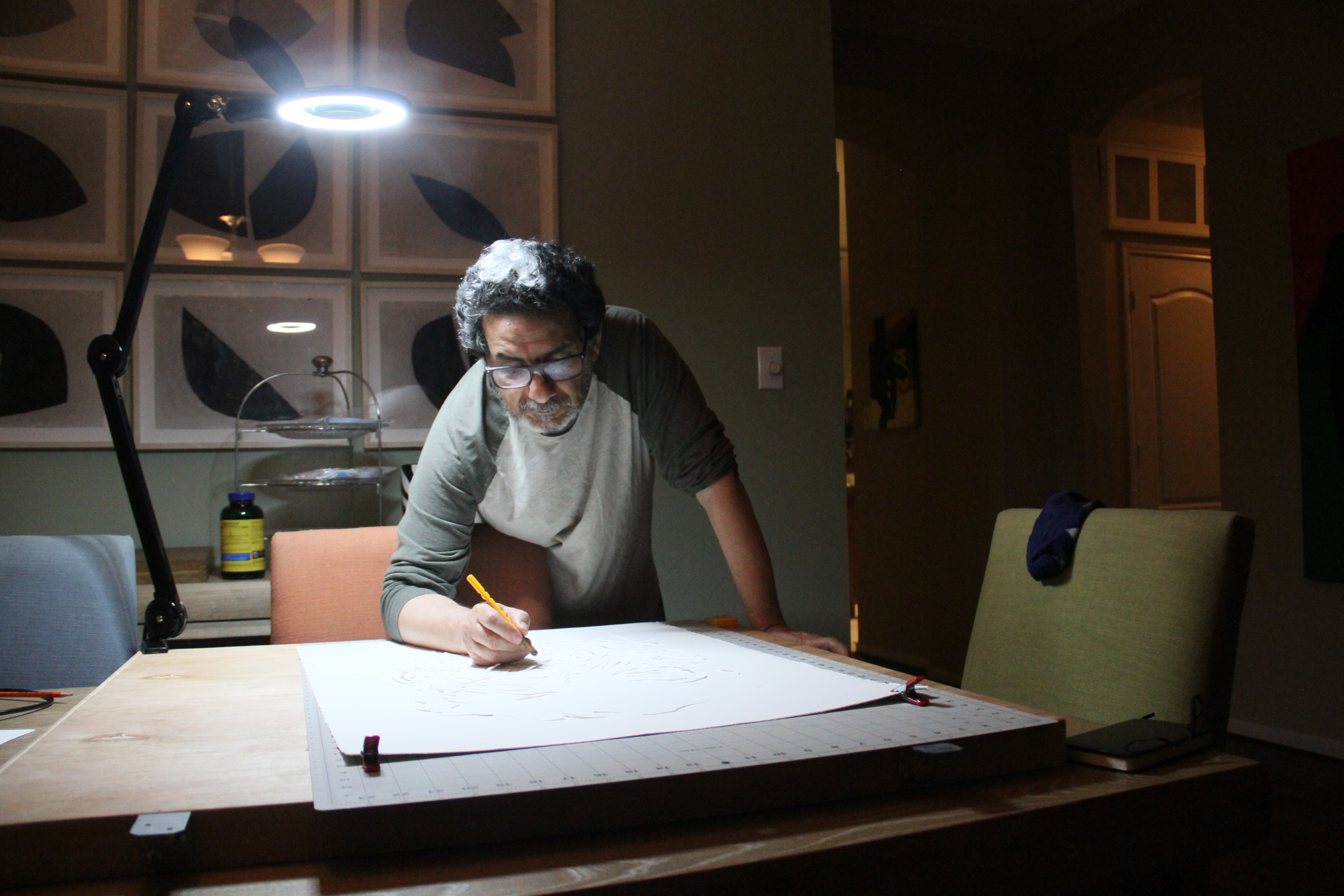
- Nazar Yahya in 2018
- Born: 1963 (age 62–63)
- Education: B.F.A. Academy of Fine Arts, Baghdad, Iraq
- Movement: Contemporary art
- Website: http://www.nazaryahya.com

Nazar Yahya is an Iraqi artist living in Houston, Texas. Nazar currently works on installations and inkjet on cotton paper projects.

== Early life and education ==
Nazar Yahya, born in Baghdad, Iraq, began exhibiting in Baghdad in the late 1970s. He earned his B.F.A. at the Academy of Fine Arts, Baghdad in 1986. From 1986 to 1991, Nazar worked as a map painter in the Army’s rear lines. In 2003, during the outbreak of war in Iraq, he took his family to Amman, Jordan. Currently he lives in Houston, Texas.

== Career ==
Nazar Yahya began his work with metal creating etchings and later continued to works on canvas, as well as paper and photography. In his early career, Nazar worked on experiments with dafatir (singular: daftar); a new expression of artist's book, or art object, possessing a distinct postmodern interpretation of the Islamic manuscript production. During the 1990s and throughout the invasion, Dafatir as a vehicle of expression intensified in Iraq.

== Work ==
=== Major exhibitions ===
Nazar’s work has been exhibited in the Middle East: Beirut, Bahrain, Amman, Dubai, Qatar; Europe: London, Norway; Bangladesh; and the United States: Texas.

==== Select list of notable works ====
- Card of Illumination

== See also ==
- Iraqi art
- List of Iraqi artists
