= Nadhim Ramzi =

Iraqi graphic designer, painter and photographer

Mohammed Ramzi
- Born: 14 July 1928; Baghdad, Iraq
- Died: 18 September 2013 (aged 85); London, England
- Other names: Nadhim Ramzi
- Occupation: photographer
- Known for: photographer, designer, artist
- Notable work: Iraq:The land and the people
- Website: ramzi.co.uk

Nadhim Ramzi (Arabic: ناظم رمزي; 14 July 1928 – 18 September 2013 from a Kurdish family) was an Iraqi graphic designer, calligrapher, photographer, and painter best known for documenting life in Iraq from the 1950s by photography.

== Life and career ==
Nadhim Ramzi was born in Baghdad into a family of Kurdish background. In his youth, Ramzi began to recognize the beauty of his natural environment and the local people in various parts of Iraq due to his father's constant movement. His father was administrative staff member during 1934–1944; Ramzi liked birds hunting and learned to draw them. He also loved the wilderness and the native people. Ramzi started to get involved and participate in a lot of hobbies that affected his future.

In Al-Yusufiyah he started practicing Islamic geometric patterns and became obsessed with it, and in Khan Bani Saad he found happiness in the life of the countryside and grazing sheep: "It was to this small village a great impact on my lifestyle and behavior. He watched artisans making carpets and ceramics, which aroused his interest in traditional design. He taught himself to paint at a very young age.

And in Al-Mahawil District he got in touch with the ancient hills and ruins of the Babylonian civilization, inspired by the Art of Mesopotamia that has survived for centuries.

Ramzi started photography as a hobby at the age of 16, when he received his first camera as a gift. "

In an interview, Ramzi's good friend, Rifat Chidirji, described the photographer's approach:

Nadhim Ramzi was a very good friend of mine, and I knew of Latif Al-Ani's work through publications and exhibitions. They photographed with an attention to aesthetics, looking for beautiful compositions. I photographed things as they are. One day, I went out to take photographs with Nadhim Ramzi. We saw a bench. I immediately took several photographs, focusing on its structure. Ramzi went around it for about five minutes, and he ended up taking one image only. That was the difference between us. I documented quickly and moved on.

=== Ramzi's Printing Company ===
Ramzi's traveled to Paris in 1964 where he stayed for two years and was introduced to printing methods and its techniques, He founded a printing company in Baghdad and named it after his name, It was one of the best printing companies in Iraq, it was located near Al Rasheed Camp's main road. The company was established in the 1970s and founded by Ramzi himself. It offered a variety of printing products and services with a focus on quality, and service.

It contained three main departments:

1. Technical Workshop (managed by Ramzi himself)
2. Financial Department(supervised by Lawyer Mehdi Ali Zaini)
3. Printing Department (managed by Mryosh Faleh)

== Work ==
=== Exhibitions ===
==== One man show ====
- 1958 – Photography Exhibition, Baghdad.
- 1972 – Political Cartoons Exhibition, Baghdad.
- 1977 – Photography Exhibition, Iraqi Cultural Center, London.
- 2010 – Last Exhibition, Baghdad.

==== Group exhibitions ====
- 1956–1960 – S.P Group Exhibition, Iraqi Artist Society, Baghdad.
- 1957 – Iraqi Modern Art, Beirut.
- 1970 – Iraqi Poster Exhibition, National Gallery of Modern Art, Baghdad.
- 1977 – Six Iraqi Artist, National Gallery of Modern Art, Baghdad.
- 1980 – Seven Iraqi Artist, Iraqi Cultural Center, London.:

==== Publications ====
Ramzi published a number of books, mostly consisting of his photographs, including:

- Iraq: The Land and The People, London, Iraqi Cultural Centre, (1977) 1989
- From the Memory, Beirut, 2008
- Iraq: Photography Of Some Features Of The Life In The Twentieth Century, Beirut, 2009
- My Journey With The Camera, Amman, 2010

== See also ==
- Arabesque
- Iraqi art
- Islamic art
- List of Iraqi artists
