= Widad Al-Orfali =

Iraqi artist and musician

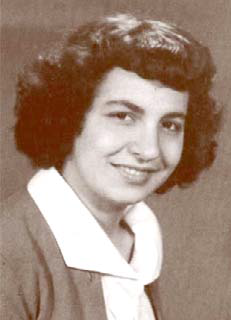
- Orfali in the 1950s
- Born: 1929 (age 96–97); Baghdad, Mandatory Iraq
- Website: www.orfaligallery.com

Widad Al-Orfali (وداد الأورفه لي) is an Iraqi artist and musician. In the early 1980s, she founded a private art gallery in Iraq, which she later moved to Jordan after the start of the Iran-Iraq War.

== Life and career ==
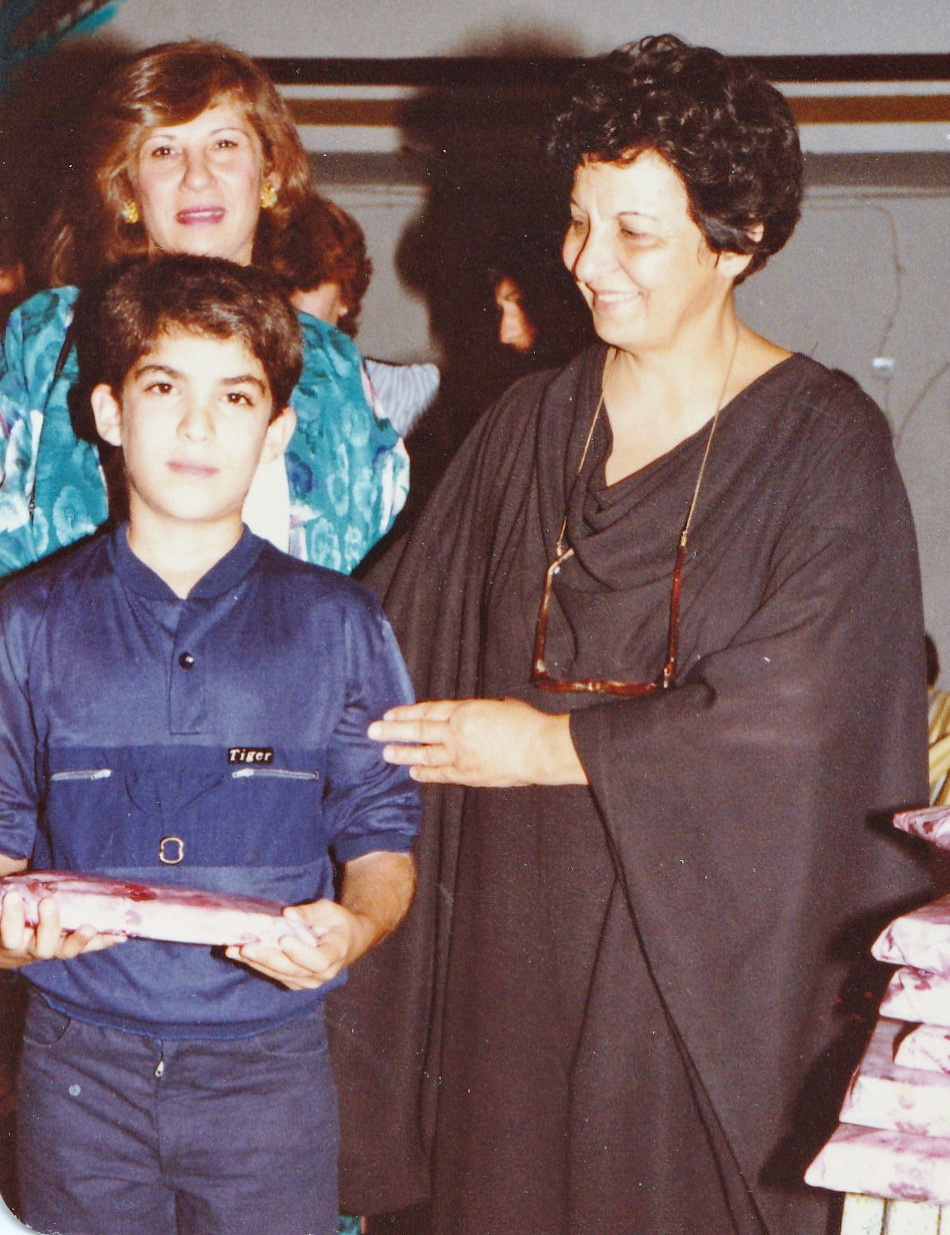
Widad Al-Orfali, standing at her art gallery, the Orfali Art Gallery in Baghdad, Iraq, awards a prize to a participating painter (left). Mid-1980s

Orfali was born in Baghdad in 1929. Her father was Makki Al-Orfali, a judge, and she grew up studying abroad. She studied at the Beirut College for Women for three years, before attending Queen Alia College in Baghdad, where she graduated from with a B.A. in social work.

She attended the Institute of Art in Baghdad, studying under artists Faiq Hassan, Faraj Abbo, Ismail al-Shaikhly, and others. She graduated from the institute in 1960. In 1964, she held her first solo exhibition in West Germany.

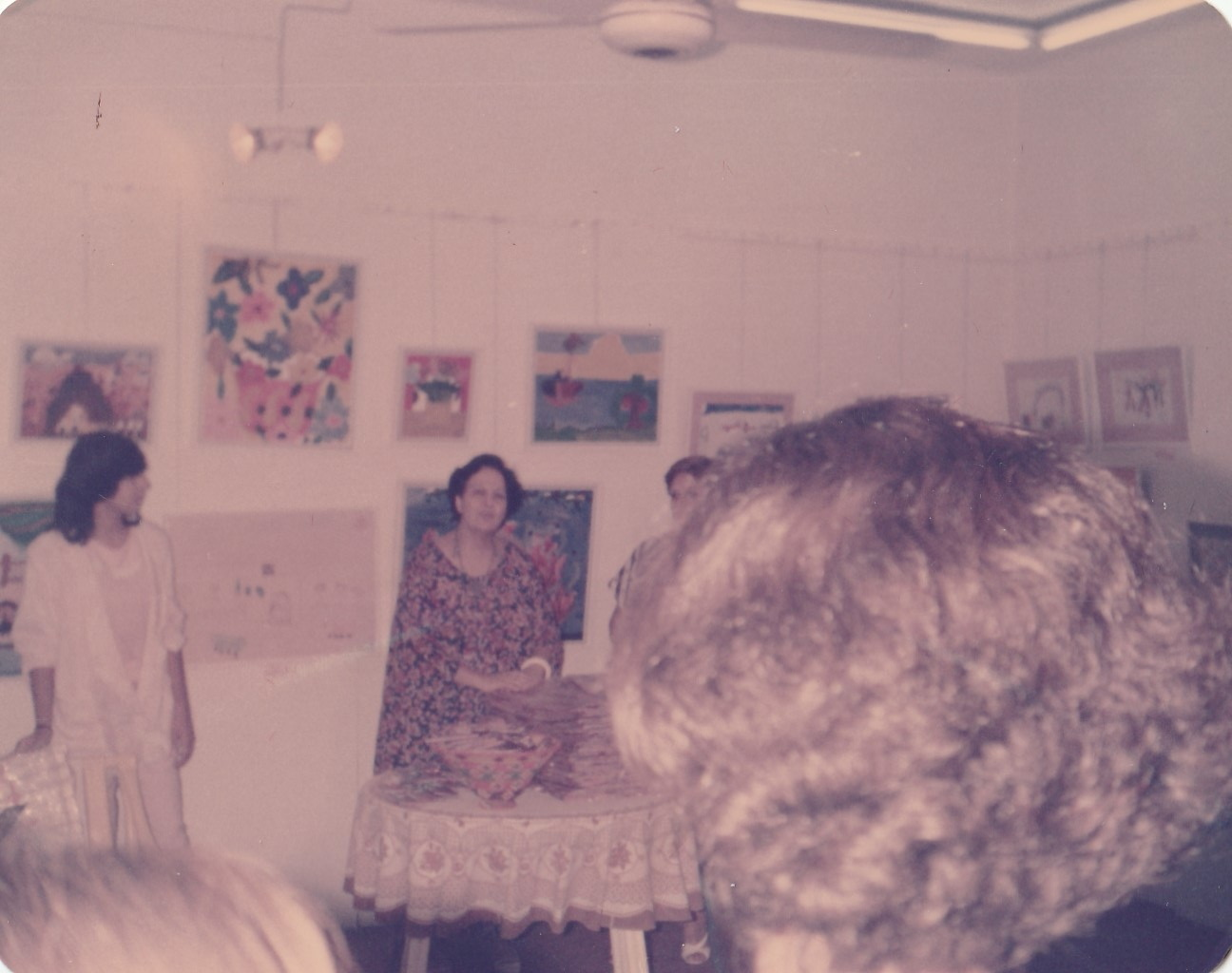
Widad Al-Orfali at Al-Orfali Gallery in Baghdad, Iraq. Mid-1980s.

In 1983, she established one of the first private art galleries in Iraq. Named the Orfali Gallery (or Orfali Art Gallery), the space was originally opened in the Al Mansour neighborhood. The gallery later expanded into a cultural center and increased their offerings outside of art exhibitions. It hosted musical performances, language classes, and poetry readings.

During the Gulf War in 1991, she stayed in her home and studio with other artists and musicians and worked on paintings, despite bombs being dropped in the area. She left Baghdad around 1996, returning two years later during the 1998 bombing of Iraq. Upon her return, she announced she would relocate her gallery.

In 2003, Orfali was forced to leave Iraq due to the US-Iraq War. She moved to Amman, Jordan, where she re-opened the Orfali gallery.

In 2011, EMI Music released her first album, Rhythms of Arabia, a collection of instrumental music. She published her memoir Sowalif in 2016.

== Artwork ==
Orfali's paintings are known for focusing on fantasy cityscapes, which she calls "dream cities". These paintings include detailed architectural and floral motifs. They are inspired by cities she had visited, primarily in Andalusia and Baghdad, as well as early illuminated manuscripts. While reflecting on her works based on Andalusian cities, she stated in 1999, "I run away from reality and live in these cities... This is my Baghdad." For her paintings of Baghdad, she uses blues, golds and greens—traditional Islamic and Baghdadi colors.

Orfali's works are primarily created using oil paint and watercolors. Her art is held by the Barjeel Art Foundation and the Hindiyeh Museum in Jordan. It has previously been held by the Iraqi National Museum of Modern Art. In 2010, one of her pieces was included in the "Iraqi Art Red List: A Partial List of the Artworks Missing from the National Museum of Modern Art Baghdad–Iraq", published by the National Museum of Modern Art.

== Personal life ==
Orfali is married to Hamid Al-Azawi, a diplomat, and together they have two daughters and a son. Her son grew up to become an art dealer. Other than in Iraq, Orfali has also lived in New York, Paris, Sudan, and Tunisia. She plays the oud, zither and piano.

She is based in Amman, Jordan.
