= Qais Al-Sindy =

Iraqi contemporary artist and painter (born 1967)

- قيس السندي
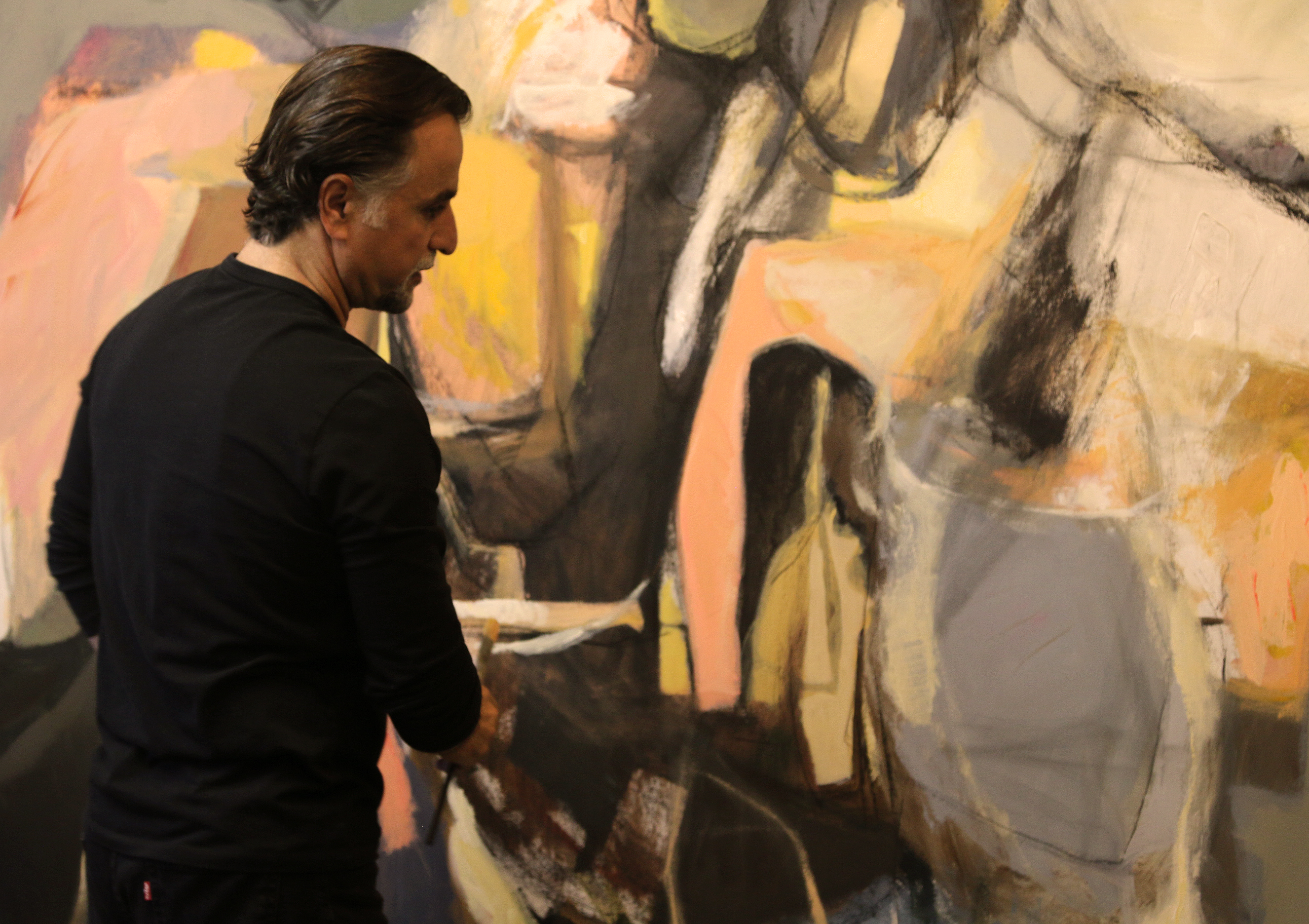
- Born: 1967 (age 58–59); Baghdad, Iraq
- Education: University of Baghdad (BSc 1989; BA 2000; MFA 2004)
- Known for: Painting, installation art, video art
- Notable work: Letters Don't Burn (2007); 16x20x20 (2018)
- Movement: Expressionism
- Website: www.qaissindy.com

Qais Al-Sindy (Arabic: قيس السندي; born 1967) is an Iraqi-American painter and multimedia artist who lives and works in San Diego, California. He trained first as an engineer and then as a painter at the University of Baghdad, left Iraq in 2004, and settled in the United States in 2008.

Al-Sindy works chiefly in an expressionist idiom, though his projects routinely extend into installation art, video art and sound. Three subjects recur across his work: exile and forced migration, war and its material residue, and the cultural memory carried out of Iraq by those who left. Critics have read his paintings as records of what survives displacement rather than as war reportage. His work has been shown at the Jerusalem Fund's Gallery Al-Quds and the Joan Hisaoka Healing Arts Gallery in Washington, D.C., at Errm Art Gallery in Riyadh, and on the international tour of the interfaith exhibition ABRAHAM: Out of One, Many.

== Early life and education ==
Al-Sindy was born in Baghdad in 1967 into an Iraqi Christian family. The curator Paul-Gordon Chandler describes him as of Chaldean Christian heritage; the Assyrian Arts Institute lists him among Assyrian artists, and a profile published by the Assyrian Universal Alliance Foundation states that he was born to an Assyrian family. He began painting at about the age of fourteen and copied well-known works while still at school.

He took a BSc from the College of Engineering at the University of Baghdad in 1989. He returned to the same university to study art, graduating from the Academy of Fine Arts in 2000 and completing an MFA there in 2004. (Note: Sources differ on the date of the first fine-arts degree. Hani Hourani, Chandler and The Arab Weekly give 2000, as does the artist's own curriculum vitae; an Al Jazeera report of 2010 gives 2002, the year the artist's CV records a diploma in French from the French Cultural Centre in Baghdad.)

== Career ==
=== Iraq and Jordan ===
Al-Sindy left Iraq shortly after completing his MFA. He later told the writer Weam Namou that conditions during his studies had already grown difficult, that travel was dangerous without a sponsor, and that he faced harassment from insurgents before deciding to go.

He spent roughly four years in Amman, Jordan, where he joined the architecture department of the College of Engineering at Applied Science University as a teacher of freehand drawing and painting. In 2006 he showed work in Fribourg, Switzerland, and lectured on contemporary Iraqi art at the University of Fribourg. His first major exhibition, Letters Don't Burn, opened at the Dar Al-Anda Gallery in Amman in 2007.

=== United States ===
Al-Sindy moved to the United States in 2008 and settled in San Diego, where he has worked as a full-time artist. By 2012 he had mounted about ten solo exhibitions, most of them in the United States and the remainder in Amman and Dubai, and had taken part in the International Cairo Biennale.

Washington became a recurring venue. He exhibited at the Iraqi Cultural Center in 2010, 2011 and 2014, at the Syra Art Gallery in 2014, at Gallery Al-Quds in 2018, and at the Joan Hisaoka Healing Arts Gallery in 2016 and 2022. His most recent solo project, Scars Upon the Earth: The Destruction of War, opened at SD Art Advisory in San Diego in April 2025.

== Work ==
=== Themes and method ===
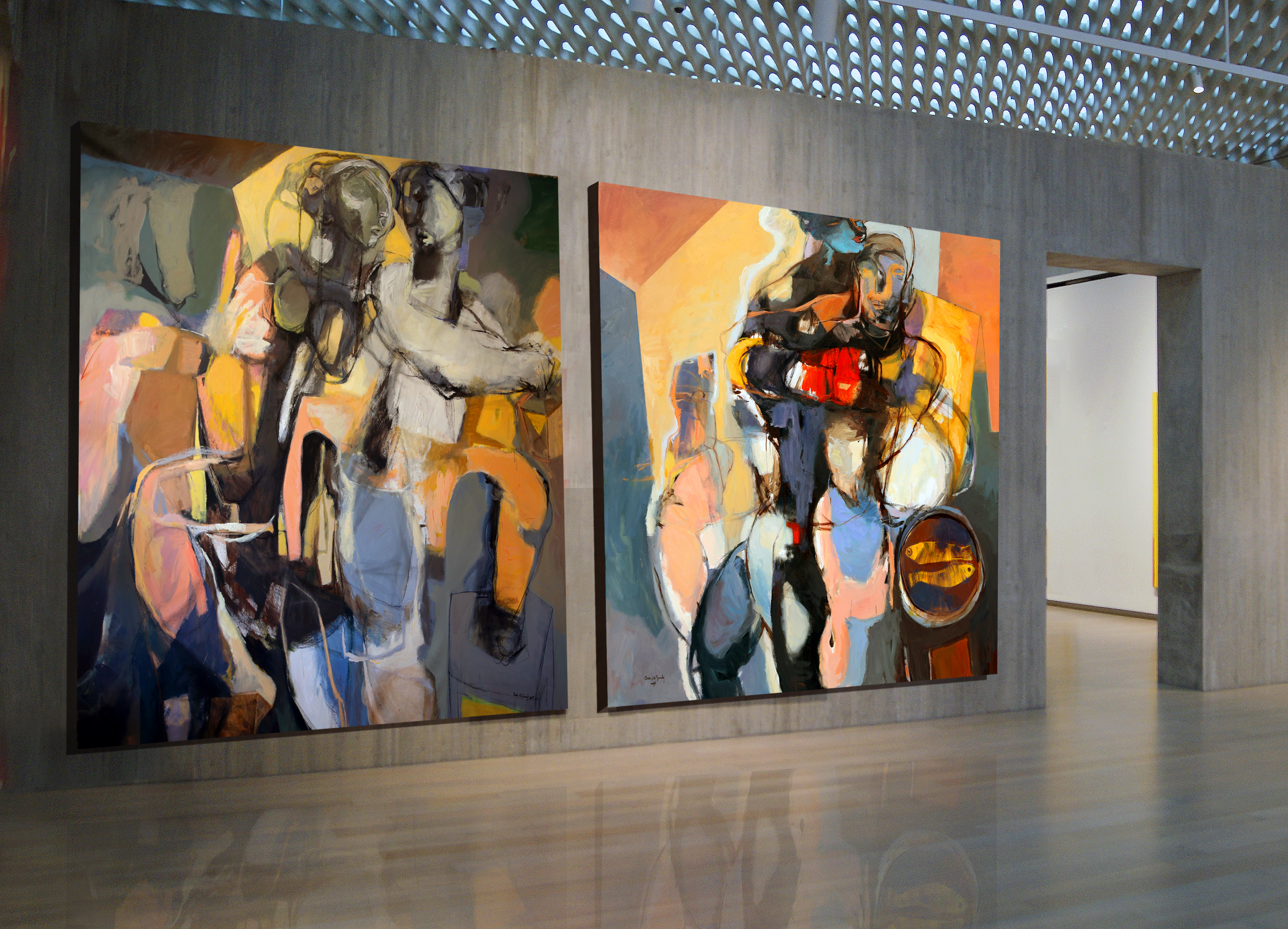
Qais Al-Sindy, "Diogenes & Coalition"

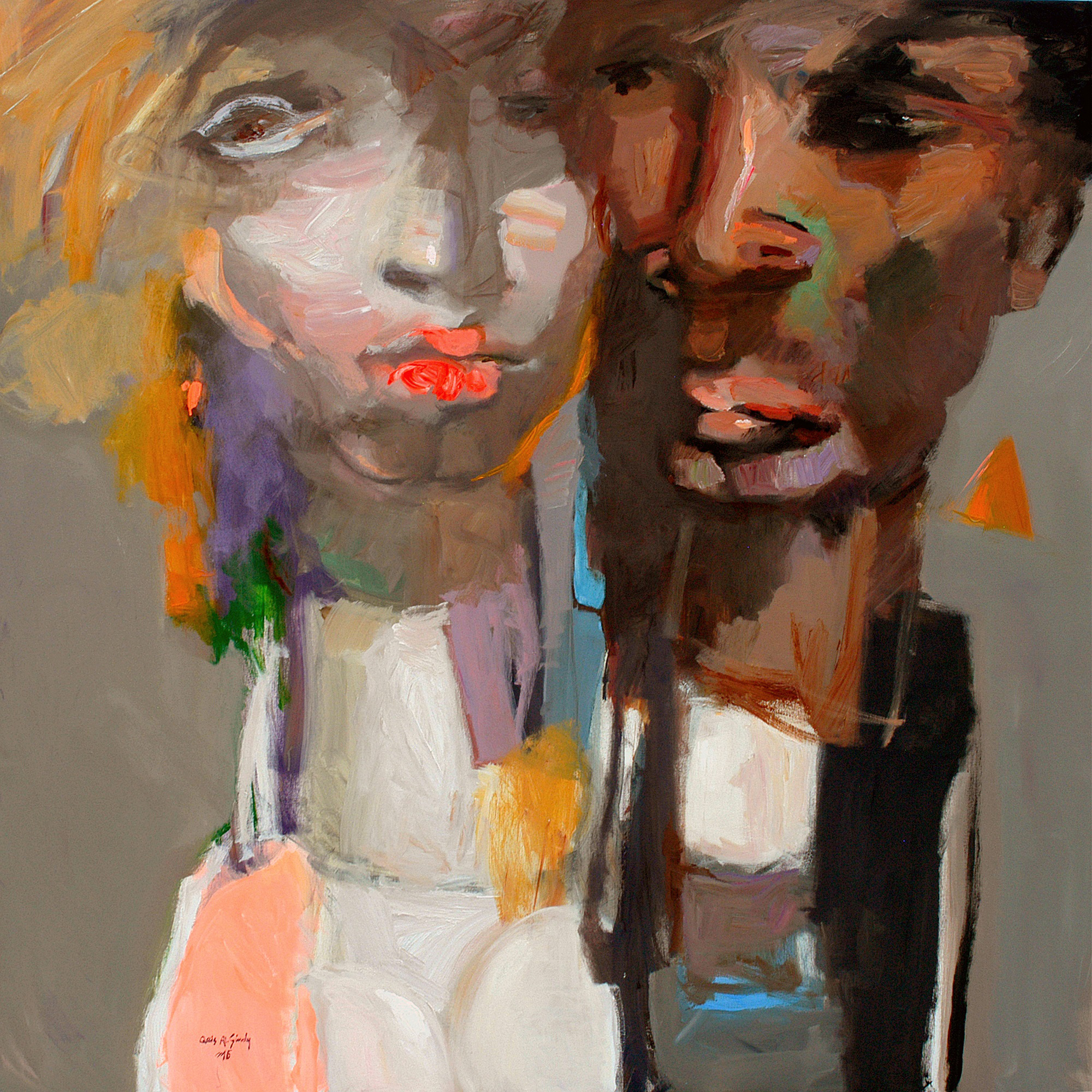
Qais Al-Sindy, "Lovers"

Al-Sindy has said that his themes derive from stories and poems rather than from observed scenes, and that he intends viewers to convert his paintings back into narratives of their own. He names Willem de Kooning as the painter he most admires and works with classical music playing.

Alongside painting he uses installation, video and recorded sound, and he has often built exhibitions around a single governing object or motif. Writing in Al Majalla in 2025, the critic Mimoza Al-Arawi observed that he lets damaged things speak in place of people, on the argument that a burnt tank or an empty helmet is more truthful than a speech.

=== Letters Don't Burn ===
Letters Don't Burn responded to the destruction of the library of the College of Fine Arts at the University of Baghdad, which was set alight by looters in 2003 with the loss of some 70,000 volumes. Al-Sindy visited the ruined building and built the project from what he found there. The exhibition combined painting with installation, conceptual art and a video work, and incorporated charred books from the library itself.

The video component, also titled Letters Don't Burn, was his first work in the medium and runs to roughly ten minutes. (Note: Durations given for the video vary. The artist's own listing gives 10 minutes 22 seconds; the Jordanian daily Al-Ghad reported ten minutes; a 2015 interview described an eleven-minute documentary.)

=== The Lost Paradise and The Struggle for Survival ===
The Lost Paradise, shown at the Orient Gallery in Amman in 2010, gathered more than twenty paintings on the condition of Iraqis who had gone abroad after the 2003 invasion. Al-Sindy told Al Jazeera that he had tried to present the human struggle to find a better state, and that the paradise sought differs from canvas to canvas according to each person's circumstances.

He returned to the subject in 2012 at the Ro'ya 32 Gallery in Amman with The Struggle for Survival. The Jordanian researcher and critic Hani Hourani, reviewing the show, treated it as a case study of one artist's exile that opened onto the wider phenomenon of forced migration. The exhibition combined 35 acrylic and mixed-media canvases with a video work and two installations. The video divided the screen in two, running enlarged footage of a flock of sheep wandering without direction beside airport footage that fixed on the feet of travellers passing with their luggage. Hourani read the pairing as an argument that the world reduces migrants to herds in permanent motion. Of the installations, one addressed water scarcity by ranking rows of coloured bottles in strict geometric order with a single empty plastic water container standing apart from them; the other placed two suitcases of unequal size on a plinth, waiting, as if those who left home were never able to unpack.

=== Encoded Histories ===
For Encoded Histories, a two-person exhibition with Doris Bittar at the Mesa College Art Gallery in San Diego in 2014, Al-Sindy showed installations drawn directly from the experience of leaving Iraq. IOM Luggage consisted of the two regulation suitcases he had been permitted when he emigrated. White Undershirt ranged men's white vests along a row of flagpoles, recalling the garments hung outside Baghdad homes to signal that the occupants would not fire on advancing troops. Mamdooh was a sequence of four paintings of a friend killed by a car bomb, made using the dead man's ashes. A floor piece, Foot Hold, invited visitors to find their own print among printed footprints of varying sizes.

=== 16x20x20 ===
16x20x20 opened at the Jerusalem Fund's Gallery Al-Quds in Washington in September 2018 and consisted of twenty paintings, each measuring 16 by 20 inches. The canvases and frames were uniform, but Al-Sindy had gathered the materials for them in different countries, which prompted the governing idea that ingredients drawn from everywhere remain fundamentally alike. Most panels show a single figure in colour against grey. Having titled them, Al-Sindy commissioned writers to compose poems bearing the same titles, and the opening reception included a reading by the poet Zeina Azzam.

Reviewing the show for The Washington Post, Mark Jenkins singled out Woman in Red and the near-monochrome The Woman Who Carried Her Country Over Her Head, and judged the suite closer to a tribute to migrant resilience than to a lament.

=== ABRAHAM: Out of One, Many ===
In 2019 the peacebuilding arts organisation CARAVAN commissioned Al-Sindy, the Iraqi painter Sinan Hussein and the Israeli painter Shai Azoulay to represent, respectively, the Christian, Muslim and Jewish traditions in a single exhibition. Each produced five paintings on five episodes or attributes drawn from the life of Abraham: living as a pilgrim, welcoming the stranger, sacrificial love, compassion and friendship with God.

Curated by Paul-Gordon Chandler, ABRAHAM: Out of One, Many opened at St Paul's Within the Walls in Rome in May 2019, travelled to the American Cathedral in Paris and to the Edinburgh Festival Fringe, then toured the United States before closing in West Hartford, Connecticut, in November 2021. Al-Sindy's contribution I left my land, my land did not leave me was reproduced in The Christian Century in June 2022 with a commentary by Lil Copan. It shows Abraham departing Ur, now Nasiriyah, carrying a lamb, with the ziggurat behind him. Al-Sindy attached wool cut from an old Nasiriyan shepherd's cloak to the canvas so that the picture would contain material from the patriarch's own country.

=== Horses ===
Neighs in the Houses of Wind, a solo exhibition of 51 paintings and multimedia works, opened at the Errm Art Gallery in Riyadh in February 2022. The horses in the series are shown loaded with bundles that echo their own shapes. Al-Sindy told The Arab Weekly that a horse becomes a home for its owner in transit, and that the baggage stands for hopes and inheritances as much as for possessions.

=== Binaries ===
Binaries ran at the Joan Hisaoka Healing Arts Gallery, part of the Smith Center for Healing and the Arts in Washington, from December 2022 to January 2023. The paintings set paired opposites against one another, among them love and hate or autonomy and dependence, on the premise that neither term of a pair can exist alone.

Reviewing the exhibition, Mark Jenkins identified war and peace as the most important of these pairings. He described canvases of abandoned tanks resting in ruin as accidental monuments to combat, and a comparably stark painting of piled bones. Jenkins found the handling uneven by design: a symbolic scene of a man carrying his horse on his shoulders is relatively crisp, while other pictures verge on Cubism or render flesh in a manner recalling Francis Bacon. He picked out the near-abstract Harmonious Binaries and The Last Look at the Homeland, in which a girl glances back over her shoulder against a bold red ground.

=== Scars Upon the Earth ===
Scars Upon the Earth: The Destruction of War (2025) turned to abandoned military hardware. Rusted tanks, burnt aircraft and derelict vehicles appear without the people who operated them, isolated as though awaiting judgment. The San Diego presentation combined painting with installation and sound, including recorded rocket and explosion noise. Al-Sindy described the works as visual testimony to civilisations stripped of their features by violence, and told Asharq News that his imagination had been formed by successive wars, the first of which began before he was thirteen.

== Critical reception ==
Criticism of Al-Sindy's painting has tended to concentrate on the movement between legible figures and passages that dissolve towards abstraction. Hourani's 2012 review drew attention to a choice that ran against expectation: rather than treating exile in sombre colour, Al-Sindy gave it heat and chromatic glare, in tones he associated with the light of Iraq and the wider Levant. Hourani cited titles such as Summer Sun, Golden Autumn and Pink Dream, and noted that the compositions retain a structural balance, with colour distributed around the centre so that each canvas reads as a field.

Jenkins reviewed two later phases for The Washington Post. In 2018 he emphasised the conceptual armature of 16x20x20 and its account of migration; in 2022 he emphasised the internal contrasts of Binaries, where crispness and looseness, tenderness and violence, are set deliberately against one another. Al-Arawi's criticism of 2022 and 2025 traces the recurring motifs of horses, travel and military debris back to the same preoccupation with the psychological cost of leaving home.

== Affiliations ==
Al-Sindy is a member of the Iraqi Artists Syndicate, the Iraqi Plastic Artists Society and the International Association of Art under UNESCO.

== Literature ==
Al-Sindy is one of sixteen artists profiled in Weam Namou's Iraqi Americans: The Lives of the Artists, the third volume of her series on the Iraqi-American community.

== Gallery ==
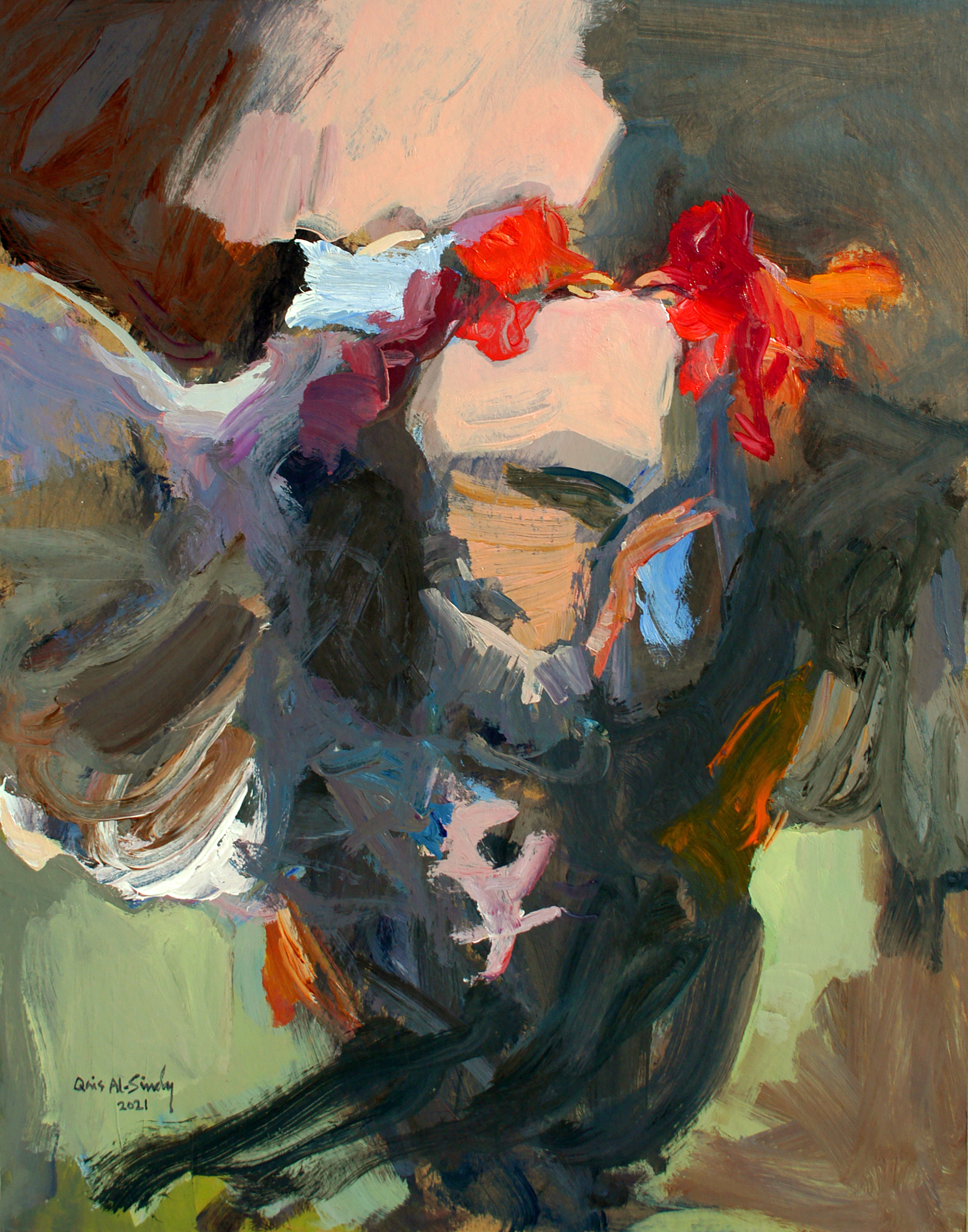
Clash of Roosters

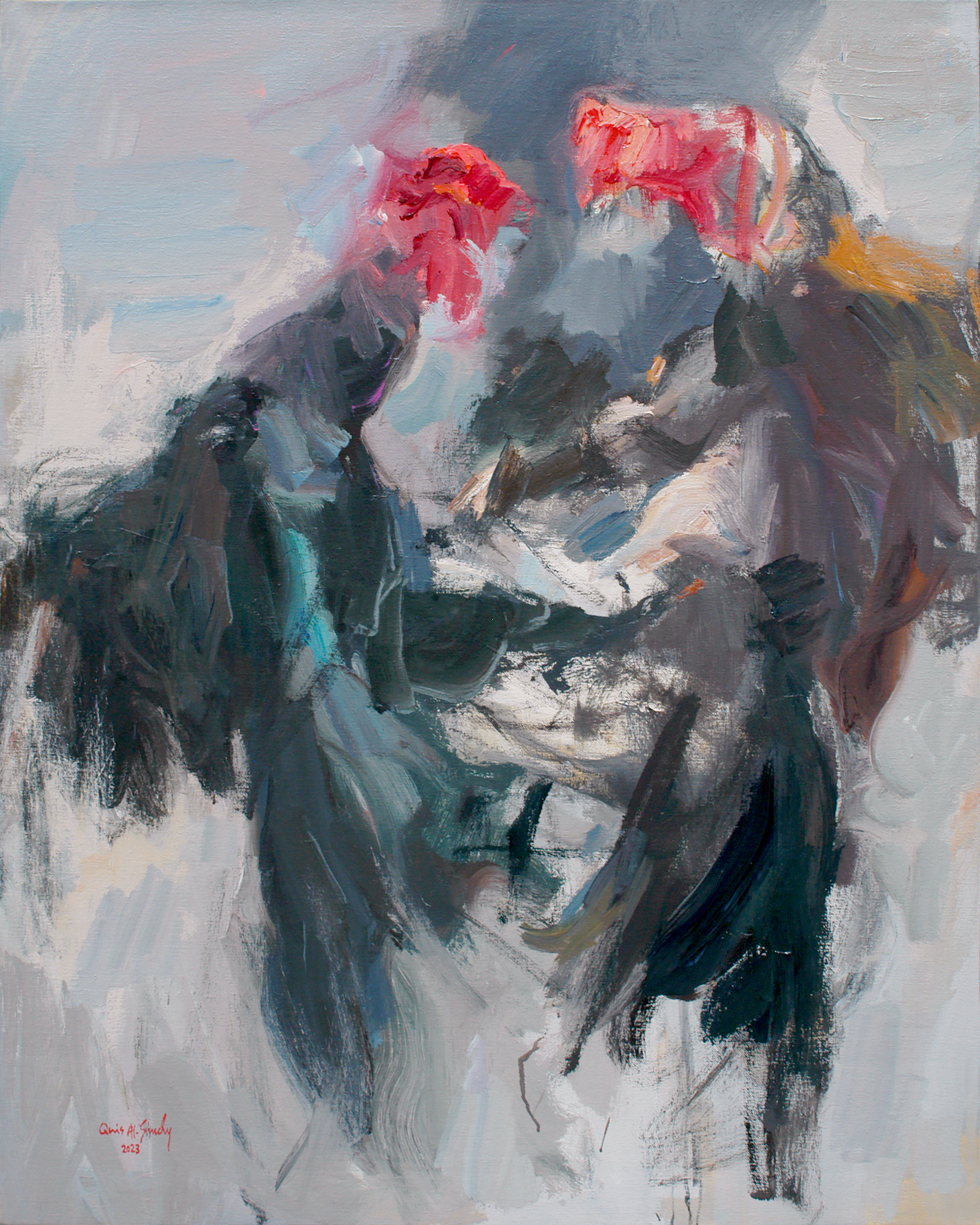
Black Roosters Fight

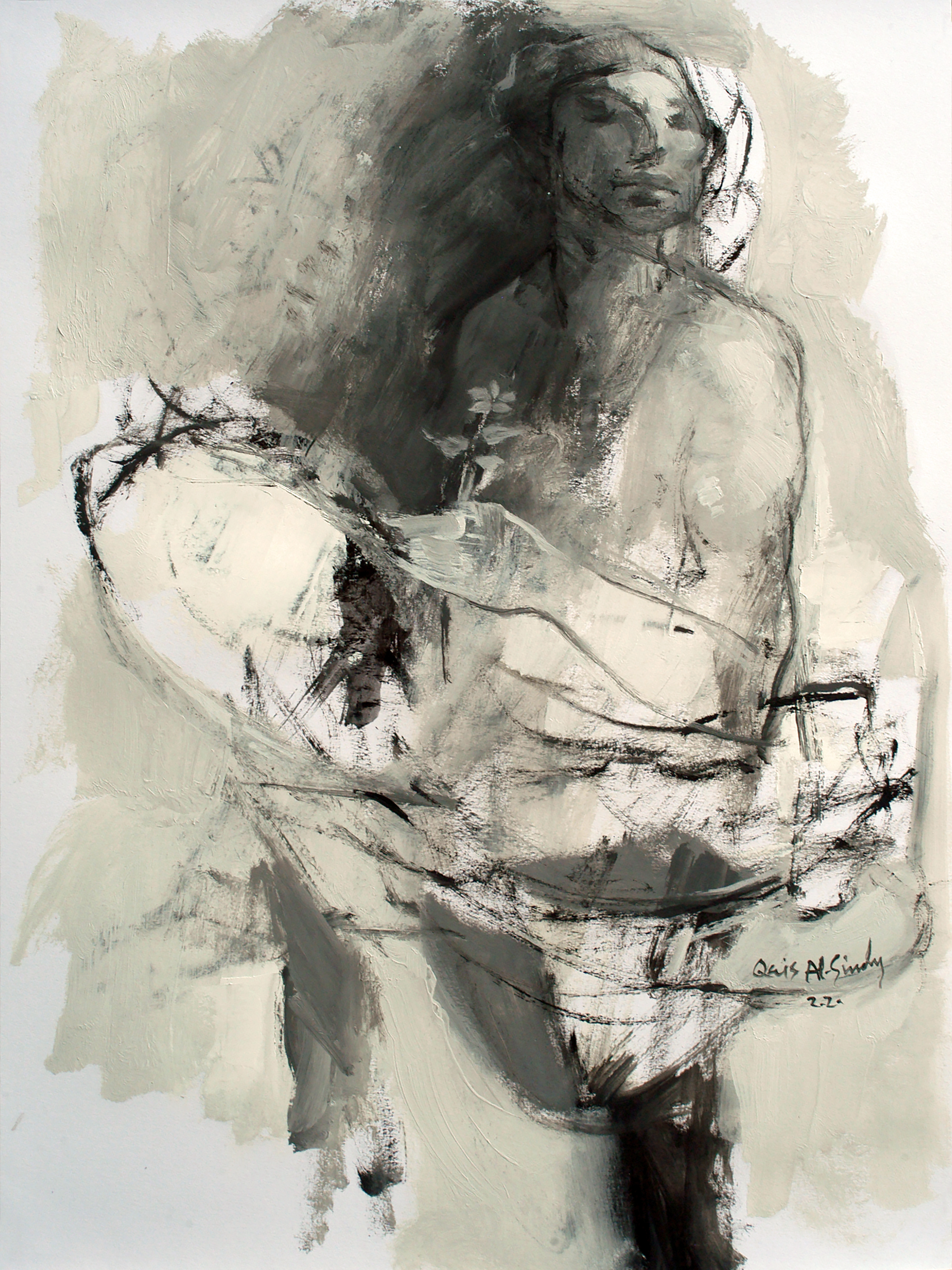
I am alive, I am alive

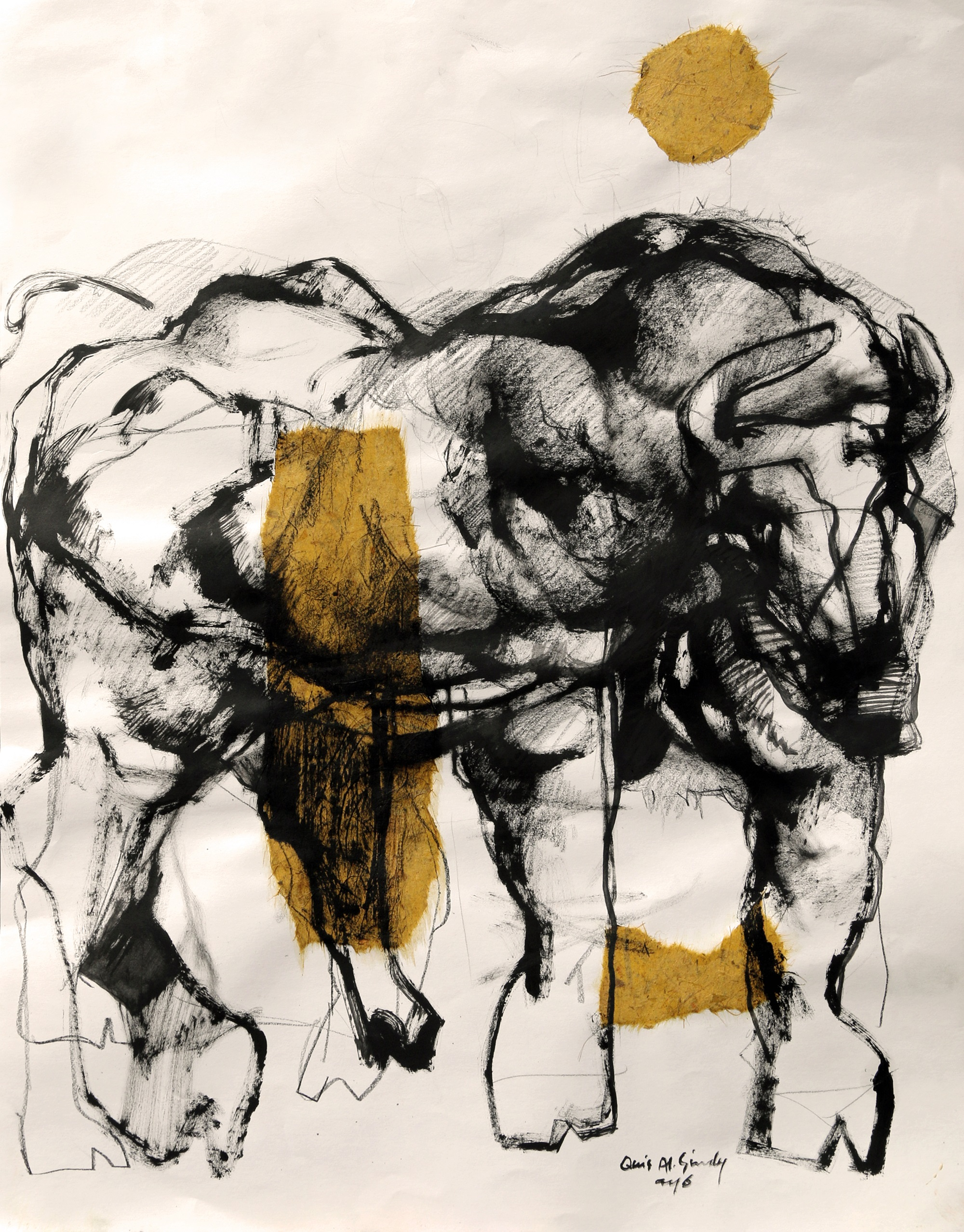
Strength

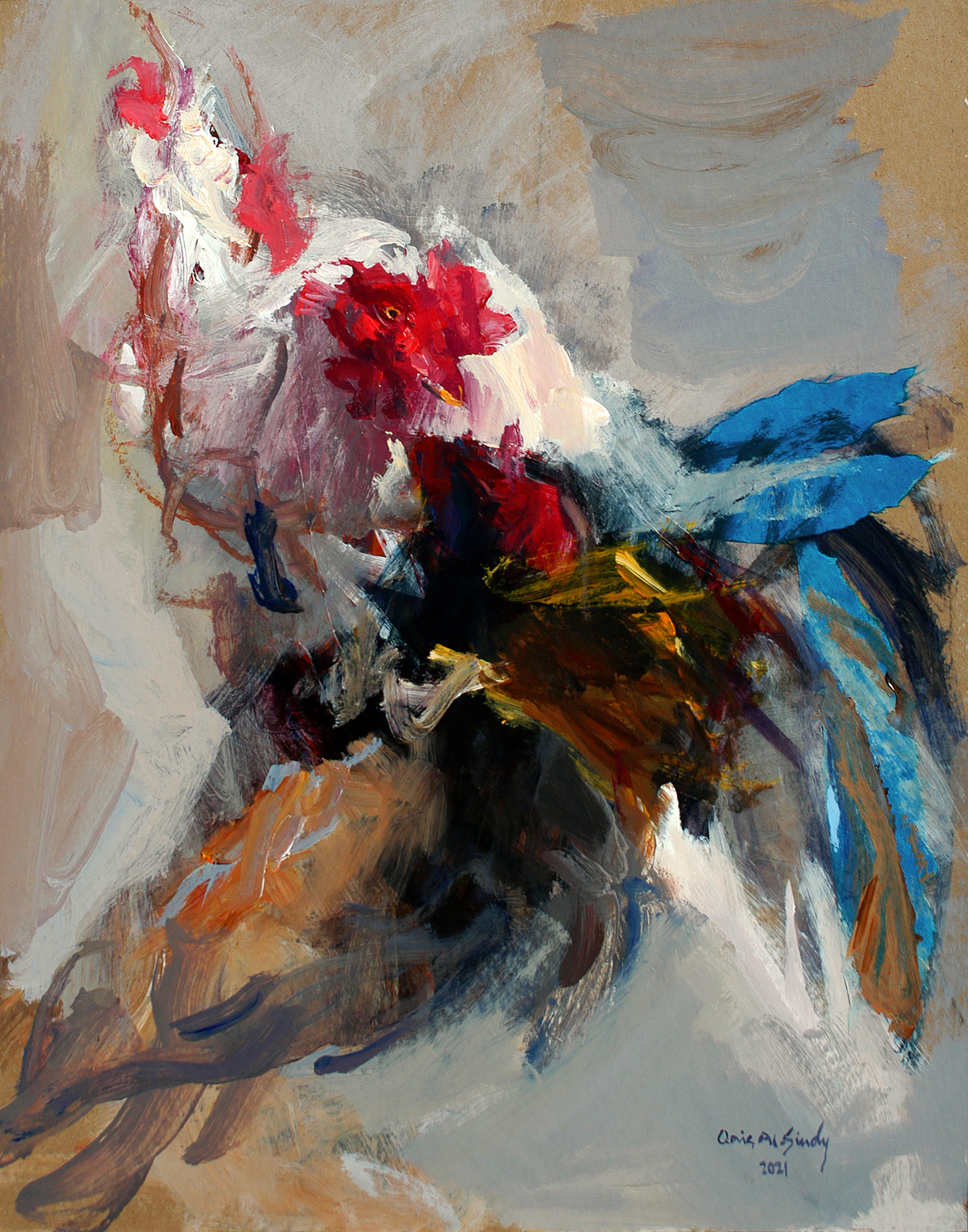
Struggle for Survival

== See also ==
- Iraqi art
- List of Iraqi artists
