= Ahmed Al Safi =

Iraqi Artist.Painter and sculptor

- احمد الصافي
- Born: 1971 (age 54–55); Al Diwaniyah, Iraq
- Education: Fine Arts Academy, Baghdad
- Known for: Sculpture

Ahmed Al Safi (Arabic: احمد الصافي, born 1971) is an Iraqi sculptor and painter.

== Life and career ==
Al Safi won the Ismail Fatah Al Turk Prize for young sculptors in 2000.

Al Safi's art reflects the concerns of a generation of Iraqi artists in the 1990s who were living through a time of international embargo and homeland dictatorship. Throughout the period of the embargo, Al Safi made sculptures and paintings in his Baghdad studio, his work collected by foreign diplomats and other visitors from the West, as well as collectors from the Middle East.

Known for his attenuated figures cast in bronze, Al Safi's representations of men strive to fly, leap or balance on precarious perches, perhaps reflecting the complex moral balancing act required of so many Iraqis during Saddam Hussein's murderous reign. His work also uses themes from ancient Mesopotamian culture, including agrarian and fishing motifs.

== See also ==
- Iraqi art
- Islamic art
- List of Iraqi artists
