= Ghassan Muhsen =

Iraqi diplomat and artist

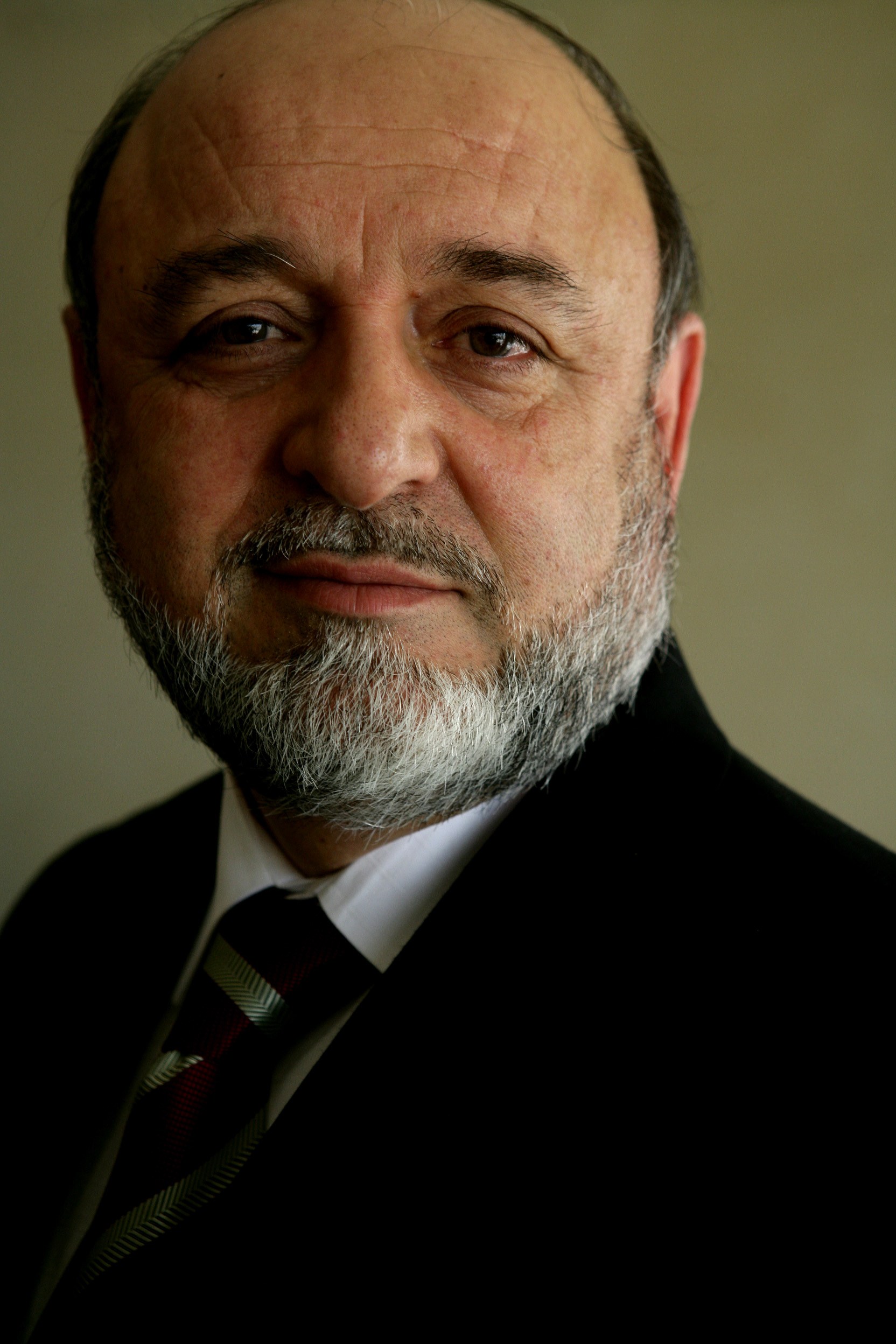
- Ghassan Muhsen
- Born: 1945 (age 80–81); Nassiriyah, Iraq
- Occupations: Ambassador artist
- Years active: 1970s–2016

Ghassan Muhsen (Arabic: غسان محسن; born 1945) is an Iraqi career diplomat, as well as an artist with over 18 solo exhibitions and over 30 joint shows in four continents ranging from New Delhi to New York City, from Dubai to Tunis. Currently Ambassador Ghassan Muhsen serves as Ambassador to the Kingdom of Bahrain. His work usually incorporates three basic elements "Floral, architectural motifs, and traditional calligraphy" His paintings are "a result of a fusion between the three" His work has been exhibited extensively throughout Europe and the Middle East.

== Personal ==
Ghassan was born in Nassiriyah, Iraq, to an army officer. Ghassan was born into an Iraqi family of Arab heritage.

== Family ==
Married to Maha Al Baroudi, Ambassador Ghassan Muhsen had three sons, Mustafa, Ziyad, Al Ahareth and Al Monther

== Art career ==
Growing up in Iraq, Ghassan Muhsin, was taught by some of the most well known pioneers of art, Shakir Hassan Al-Sai’d, Ismail Fateh Al Turk & Dr. Ismail Al Sheikhly during his high school years, but apart from that has no formal training in the arts,

== Early era 1970s to 1981 ==
While posted in New York in the 1970s Ghassan's artistic spirit surfaced. New York's vibrant cultural scene, art world, museums, people and architecture influenced Ghassan to the point where he took up oil paints and canvas and started painting in a formal fashion. His creativity was heavily influenced by his surroundings.

== Floral phase 1982 to 1991 ==
Posted to Pakistan, Ghassan was influenced by the art of the subcontinent and the environment he was living in, his works started to incorporate more and more floral motifs

== Selected solo exhibitions ==
- 2011 "A Fresh Start: New Works by Ghassan Muhsen" Pomegranate Gallery, New York, NY
- 2010 Westwood Gallery, New Jersey, NJ
- 2010 Pomegranate Gallery, New York, NY
- 2008 Assilah Cultural Festival, Assilah Morocco
- 2007 Sultan Bin Ali Owais Cultural Foundation, Dubai UAE
- 2007 The Lahore Arts Council, Lahore Pakistan
- 2007 Bahrain Interior Design Exhibition, Exhibition Center Bahrain
- 2006 Alfonoon Gallery, Kuwait
- 2005 Cultural Foundation, Abu Dhabi UAE
- 2005 Bahrain Art Center, Bahrain
- 2002 Indian Council For Cultural Relations, New Delhi India
- 2002 Baghdad Gallery, Baghdad, Iraq
- 2001 Baghdad Gallery, Baghdad, Iraq
- 2000 Baghdad Gallery, Baghdad, Iraq
- 1997 Baghdad Gallery, Baghdad, Iraq
- 1996 Abaad Gallery, Baghdad, Iraq
- 1989 Baghdad Gallery, Baghdad, Iraq
- 1986 Rothas Gallery, Rawalpindi, Pakistan
- 1985 French Cultural Centre, Islamabad, Pakistan
- 1982 Rothas Gallery, Rawalpindi, Pakistan

== Joint shows ==
- 2009 Dar El Jild, Tunis, Tunisia
- 2009 Seedi Bu Said, Tunisia
- 2007 Al Bareh Gallery, Bahrain
- 2006 Pomegranate Gallery New York, NY
- 2004 Bahrain Art Centre, Bahrain
- 2004 Assilah Cultural Festival, Assilah, Morocco
- 2001 National Art Gallery, Beijing, China
- 2001 Baghdad 3rd Art Festival, Baghdad, Iraq
- 2001 Al Orfali Art Gallery, Baghdad, Iraq
- 2000 Al Orfali Art Gallery, Baghdad, Iraq
- 2000 Baghdad Art Gallery, Baghdad, Iraq
- 1985 National Art Gallery, Islamabad, Pakistan

== See also ==
- Iraqi art
- Islamic art
- List of Iraqi artists
