= Sadik Kwaish Alfraji =

Iraqi artist

- Born: 2 September 1960 (age 65); Bagdad, Iraq
- Education: Dip Plastic Art and Painting, Institute of Fine Arts, Baghdad (1982); B.A. Academcy of Arts, Baghdad (1987); Dip. Graphic Design, Constantijn Huygens, Kampen, Netherlands (2000)
- Known for: Painting, animated videos and art installation
- Website: Sadik Alfraji Official website

Sadik Kwaish Alfraji (b. Baghdad, 1960) is an Iraqi multi-media artist, animator, video producer and installation artist noted for producing "existentialist" works with dark, shadowy figures that speak of human frailty.

== Life and career ==
Sadik Kwaish Alfraji was born in Baghdad in 1960. His initial training was as a painter and printmaker, obtaining first a Diploma of Plastic Art and Painting from Baghdad's Institute of Fine Arts (1982) and later a Bachelor of Arts from Baghdad's Academy of Arts (1987).

He studied art not long after Saddam Hussein came to power. Like many other artists, Alfraji realised that the Ba'ath Party was attempting to co-opt art and culture for use as propaganda. However, artists have the ability to play around with concepts, and they began to conceal their intended message using abstraction and other techniques to construct messages of protest that the authorities could not understand. “Dictators are stupid,” he noted, “They won't necessarily read between the lines.”

As a young artist in Baghdad in the 1980s, Alfraji worked as an animator for children's television. This sparked a life-long interest in animation and multi-media productions, which has since become the foundation for much of his work. At the time of the Iran–Iraq War, Alfraji produced a series of etchings of psychiatric patients as well as an art book, Biography of a Head (1985), the story of a head without a body. After the war, shortages of art materials and media forced many artists, including Alfraji to use "found" material such as shrapnel and bullets, which were incorporated into their artworks.

Alfraji left Iraq in the 1990s for political reasons and later settled in Amersfoort, The Netherlands where he was granted Dutch citizenship. After arriving in The Netherlands, he returned to study, enrolling at the Constantijn Huygens, Kampen, Netherlands and taking out a Diploma in Graphic Design in 2000.

He has returned to Iraq only once, in 2009, at the time of his father's death. On this visit, an encounter with his 12-year old nephew became the inspiration for his animated video, Driven By Storms, which has since been acquired by the British Museum. The artist explains:

"The day I was leaving, my little nephew, Ali, handed me a sealed envelope, requesting me to open it only after leaving Iraq. It was a letter in which he had written his own and his brother's names and the names of my children. Below that he had drawn a boat, with the words 'I wish this boat takes me to you'. That simple yet complex message touched me deeply. I could see that the little boy had put all his dreams in this boat. It was his magic boat that could take him far away from the hell of Iraq. I understood his feelings because this was the same boat that I always dreamt about when I lived in Iraq and wanted to flee from all the terrible things happening around me....Each of us has our own shiny, beautiful boat that we hope will help us to flee from the problems that exist around us and within us. We know that it is impossible to escape these ‘problems of our existence’, but we still keep trying. Our life is like a storm that drives us, and we cannot stop.

He is the subject of a book, simply titled Sadik Kwaish Alfraji, edited by Nat Muller, Schilt Publishing, Amsterdam, Netherlands (2015).

== Work ==
As he often states, his work has been influenced by Expressionism, as well as his love of philosophy and literature, especially existentialism. His artworks, with their shadowy, faceless figures and dark backgrounds are distinctive. The overarching theme in all his work is the frailty of the human condition and the question of human existence. He has exhibited at scores of Middle Eastern and European galleries. He is one of a select group of Iraqi artists to exhibit at the Venice Biennale in 2017.

Alfraji's works are housed in public collections including the British Museum, London; National Museum of Modern Art, Baghdad; The Art Center, Baghdad; National Gallery of Fine Arts Amman; Shoman Foundation, Amman; Royal Association of Fine Arts, Amman; Novosibirsk State Art Museum, Russia; and the Cluj- Napoca Art Museum, Romania; Los Angeles Country Museum; and Museum of Fine Arts, Houston

== Awards ==
- 2012 Artist of the Year at the Esquire Middle East Awards, Dubai, UAE.
- 2014 Rockefeller Foundation Bellagio Center awardee, Italy.
- 2015 Grant, Driven By Storms (Ali's Boat), Mondriaan Fund, Amsterdam, Netherlands.

== See also ==
- Iraqi art
- List of Iraqi artists
