= Abdulameer Yousef Habeeb =

Iraqi calligrapher

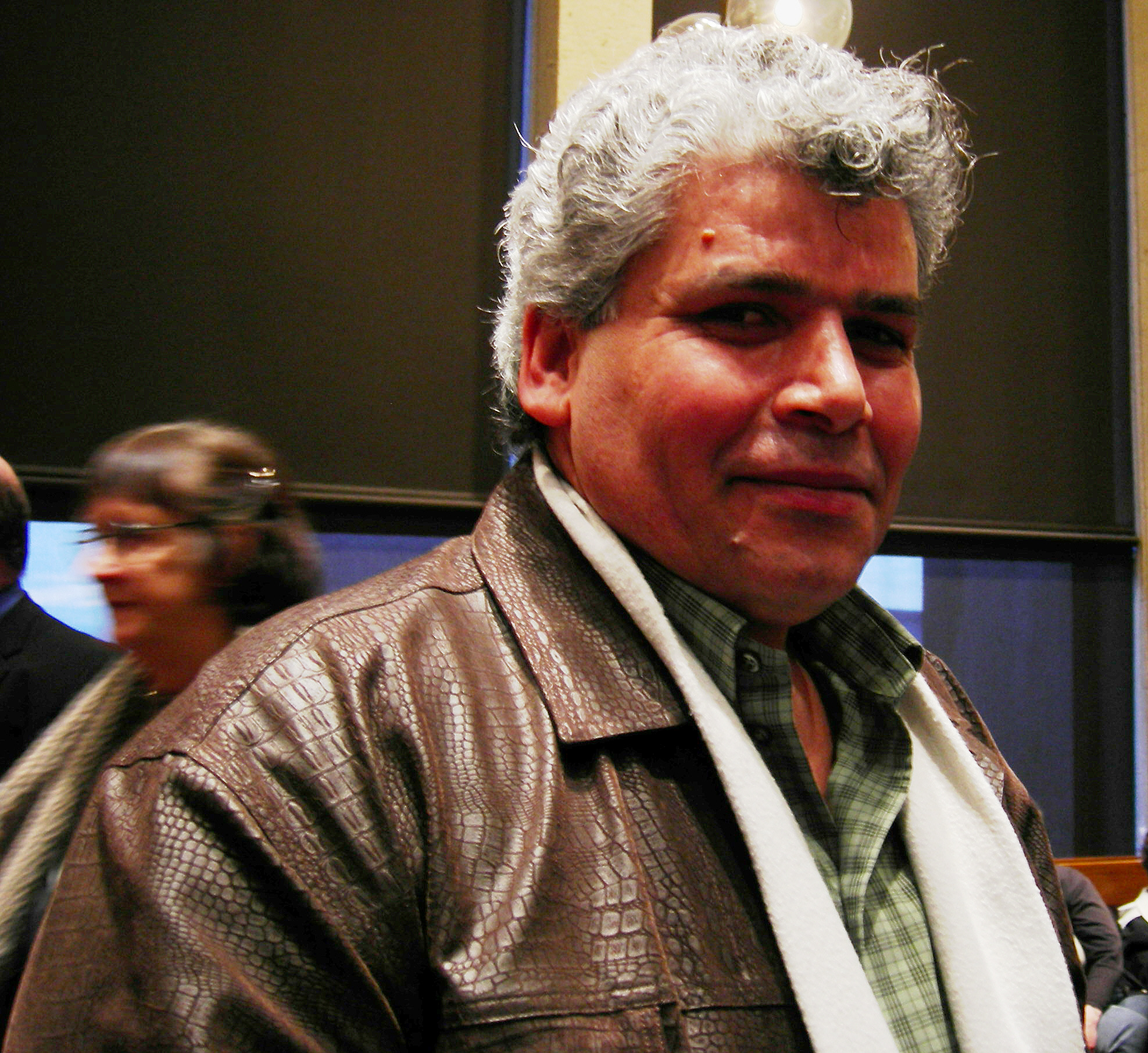
- Habeeb in 2007
- Occupations: Artist and calligrapher

Abdulameer Yousef Habeeb is an Iraqi artist and calligrapher living as of 2008 as a refugee in the United States. His detention in Havre, Montana, on April 1, 2003, apparently due to ethnic profiling, led eventually to an apology and compensation from the United States Department of Justice.

== Admission to the U.S. ==
Habeeb was originally admitted to the United States as a refugee after being persecuted under the regime of Saddam Hussein. The Iraqi government executed Habeeb's brother Abdallah in 1982; they imprisoned Habeeb himself twice, most recently in 1997, tortured him, and left him with scars. Habeeb's father, a prominent business and community leader among Iraq's Rabia tribe, had been a supporter of the old Hashemite monarchy; he was killed in 1999. The U.N. High Commissioner for Refugees granted Habeeb refugee status, and he was admitted to the U.S. in July 2002. He took up residence in Kent, Washington.

== Arrest and detention ==
On April 1, 2003, Habeeb was traveling by rail from Seattle, Washington, to Washington, DC, intending to begin a new job with an Arabic-language newspaper. He and other passengers stepped off the train to take a break during a 30-minute stop at Havre, Montana.

Two Border Patrol agents demanded to know where he was from. He answered their question accurately and produced a copy of a form showing his admission into the U.S. as a refugee. The agents asked whether he had been fingerprinted and photographed through NSEERS ("Special Registration"). He answered, accurately, that he had not: refugees are exempt from that program. They arrested him.

Additional Border Patrol and FBI agents questioned Habeeb and detained him overnight. The next day, he was charged for his failure to appear for special registration; the charging document falsely stated he had been required to do so. He was held three nights in Hill County Jail. According to the American Civil Liberties Union of Washington (ACLU-W), "[d]uring that time, he was forced to strip naked in front of a government agent and was humiliated by other detainees who called him 'Saddam.'" He was then flown to Seattle, transported through the airport. In Seattle he spent four more nights in detention, under threat of deportation, "terrified," according to ACLU-W, "that he would be sent back to Iraq."

After deportation proceedings were formally terminated May 16, 2003, Habeeb sought and received help from the ACLU. Through the ACLU Seattle attorney Jesse Wing and others represented Habeeb on a pro bono basis, bringing suit on his behalf against the government for wrongful arrest and detention.

== Habeeb's successful suit ==
Habeeb's attorneys charged that the agents had stopped Habeeb for his ethnic appearance, and that his detention violated his Fourth Amendment right to be free from unreasonable search and seizure. However, Judge Sam Haddon of the U.S. District Court in Great Falls, Montana, ruled against Habeeb in June 2006, in a ruling that was seen as justifying ethnic profiling.

On June 13, 2007, Jeffrey Sullivan (U.S. Attorney for the Western District of Washington) gave Habeeb a formal statement that "the United States of America acknowledges that, by not registering under NSEERS, you did nothing wrong. The United States of America regrets the mistake." On July 16, 2007, Judge Haddon consequently vacated his original judgment, so it will not stand as a precedent.

== See also ==
- Iraqi art
- Islamic calligraphy
- List of Iraqi artists
