= Mun'im Furat =

- Born: Na'im Barbout Wadi; 1900; Baghdad, Iraq
- Died: 7 August 1972 (aged 71–72); Baghdad, Iraq
- Known for: Sculptor
- Movement: Naive art

Mun'im Furat (1900-1972) (occasionally given as Monem Furat) was an Iraqi primitive artist, noted for his sculptures resembling Sumerian statuary. His style was very distinctive and he was the only Iraqi artist to produce works in the naive style.

== Life and career ==
Mun'im Furat was born in Baghdad in 1900 into the Al Jubur tribe. He left school at a very young age, but managed to learn how to read and write and was able to recite the Quran. His real name was Na'im Barbout Wadi, but he chose the alias Mun'im Furat. As a young man, he worked as a shepherd, butcher and labourer in order to support his family. By chance, he visited the Iraq Museum and after seeing Sumerian sculptures, he decided to become a sculptor.

He frequented the Iraqi Museum where he copied selected works to make sculptures which he could sell to dealers and shops for the tourist trade. The director of the museum sued him for this unauthorised copying, but the case was dismissed. He was often harassed by the regime and his works were work confiscated from time to time. He was detained for making a statue of the then Prime Minister, Abdel Muhsin al Sa'doun, but released shortly afterwards.

After the 1958 Revolution, he was "discovered" by Dr Akram Fadhel of the Ministry of Information, who gave him a space where he could work and helped him gain permanent employment at the Ministry of Culture. Mun'im continued working on his sculptures until he reached the retirement age.

In 1970, he exhibited in Rome, and received extensive media coverage in Italian newspapers. Alberto Ciattini, a noted Italian art critic, commented:

"An artist like Mun'im Furat is a rare phenomenon that can't be found in every time & place, because he made his work use an ancient language, in fact a language which is older than time itself".

He died on 7 August 1972, in a car accident. Shortly after his death, ten of his sculptures were exhibited at the International Fair: Triennale of Primitive Art, (10 September – 10 October 1972), in Bratislava, where he received a Special Honorary Award and a Diploma in recognition of his Art Work.

== Legacy ==
He is the subject of two books:

- Carlos Calderon Iruegas, El Extraño Mundo de Mun'im Furat (Escultor) [The Strange World of Mun'im Furat (Sculptor)], 1975.
- Nouri al- Rawi, Akram Fadhel and Na'im Barbout Wadi, Mun'im Furat: Artiste Primitif Irakien, 1974

== Work ==
Mun'im Furat was a "renowned Iraqi sculptor almost unique in his body of work, being one of the only sculptors to focus almost entirely on Babylonian statuary." His style is generally recognised as "primitive art.". As a simple man from a humble background and with no formal arts training, Furat maintained that his work was free of external influences, and by implication, his inspiration was inherited directly from his Sumerian ancestors.

== See also ==
- Iraqi art
- Islamic art
- List of Iraqi artists
