= M. J. Alhabeeb =

Iraqi American contemporary calligrapher (born 1954)

- مصدق جميل آل حبيب
- Born: Musaddak Jameel Al-Habeeb; 1 July 1954 (age 71); Iraq
- Known for: Artist, calligrapher
- Movement: Hurufiyya movement

Musaddak Jameel Al-Habeeb (Arabic: مصدق جميل آل حبيب, or M. J. Alhabeeb; born July 1, 1954 in southern Iraq) is an Iraqi American contemporary calligrapher who follows the original traditions in Arabic-Islamic calligraphy. He is self-taught, and never studied under any master calligrapher, according to the traditional norm.

== Biography ==
Alhabeeb's interest in the Arabic and Islamic calligraphy started early on when he was a child. Before he attended school at age five, he started to imitate the letters penned by his older brother who was interested in calligraphy too. He received great encouragement and praise from his second grade art teacher, who after discovering the child's early talent, started to ask him to show other students the right shape of letters on the blackboard. Alhabeeb soon discovered the famous instructional book in calligraphy by Iraq's prominent calligrapher Hashim Muhammad Al-Baghdadi. He started to repeatedly imitate Al-Baghdadi's letters and follow his method in perfecting the shapes and movements of many Arabic scripts. He continued to practice this regular routine for many years. Despite the fact that he chose economics as a field of study, and went to become a full professor at the University of Massachusetts Amherst, he has been practicing calligraphy for more than four decades.

== Personal style ==
Although he practices classic calligraphy, his own style has been distinguished by a contemporary flare. The most notable aspect of his artistic style is the striking use of color, which has been scarcely used in the classic tradition, as calligraphy work remained dominated by black and white, with occasional use of gold and turquoise. Alhabeeb's extensive web site which includes a history of the development of Arabic script, has also an artist's statement, which highlights the major aspects of Alhabeeb's own style. In this statement, Alhabeeb states: “I tend to describe my work of calligraphy as "neo-classical" for maintaining the methods, manners, and techniques of the classic calligraphers since the 8th century, but I also follow a quasi-modern and personal approach, which could be characterized by:

- The utilization of Arabesque (Az-Zakhrafah Al-Arabia) as an integrative element of calligraphy, compared to its traditional employment. I define the traditional employment of Arabesque as either an occasional and partial use in a decorative framework out of the calligraphy space, or a full Deco art, unconnected to calligraphy, but standing by its own merit. In my integrative approach, I believe only a minimum use of selected motifs of arabesque is needed for my calligraphy projects to be functional and attuned. These motifs involve intricate ornamental patterns of interlaced lines and forms, often in botanical shapes such as stems, foliage and buds. They can perfectly lend themselves to the structural subtlety of lines and space of the written words, adding grace and luster, and allowing for the use of color. Colors of the calligraphy background are mostly dark, specifically the traditional solid black, and the foreground are mostly white or other light colors. Bright colors are also sporadically and carefully used, especially in the internal spacious frames, small motifs, and in the grammatical dots (An-Nuqat). All of these components are harmonized in a single integrative structure to present the calligraphy work as one unit. I believe that the major purpose for employing colors is to enhance the visual sensory and illuminate the fundamental cohesiveness of the image. Moreover, a modified minimum use of arabesque and color is essential to help emphasize the artistic abstract form of the epigraphical composition, without forcing the stylistic piece into becoming a mere decorative art.
- Another supporting element to this approach is the minimization of the text, which is deliberately sought to maximize the effectiveness of using the words as single components in a whole image. One justification for using a minimal text stems from my view that as the text becomes longer, the fragmentation of the image increases, and the control and manageability of the creative process become increasingly limited.
- The innovative use of image repetition, symmetry, and the mirror effect. While these techniques are not new, reinvigorating and combining them with other methods and techniques is, and it is evident in my work.

== Influences ==
On his influences, Alhabeeb states: “My strong influences and inspirations were the towering talents of several generations of magnificent calligraphers and their distinct styles. The most important of these influences have been the calligraphers of the contemporary Baghdadi School spearheaded by Hashim Muhammad Al-Khattat Al-Baghdadi, and the earlier Ottoman School, represented by Sheikh Hamadullah Al-Amasi and a bunch of innovative star calligraphers who followed him.

== Painting vs. Calligraphy ==
In addition to being a classic calligrapher, Alhabeeb is a contemporary painter. Unlike many of his colleagues; painters who utilize the shape and style of the Arabic letters and words, and calligraphers who borrow some of the painting methods and styles, Alhabeeb does not mix calligraphy with painting. He treats them separately as independent genres, each with its own tradition and style. His calligraphy stays close to the classic Arabic and Islamic old school, which is free of any painting techniques. On the other hand, His painting has been described as Neo-cubism for borrowing and utilizing many of the cubists’ techniques. He worked as a graphic designer for many years, and won the first prize in three different national contests for designing postal stamps. He has published numerous articles on art theory and philosophy, and recently released a book in Arabic entitled “Art, Creativity, and Freedom”.

== Publications ==
- Alhabeeb, M.J. (2009). Rhapsody of Color: The Art of M.J. Alhabeeb. Art bookbindery, Canada.
- Alhabeeb, M.J.(2008).Alhabeeb’s Arabic Calligraphy: A Compendium of Recent Work. selected collection of original work in a special boxed edition containing 71 color plat, Asuka Books, Japan.
- Alhabeeb, M.J. (2008). Art, Creativity, and Freedom (in Arabic). Art bookbindery publishing, Canada.
- Alhabeeb, M.J.(2008). Alhabeeb's Arabic Calligraphy: a 2008 calendar. VistaPrint Co.
- Alhabeeb, M.J. (2008).Luminous Letters: MJ Alhabeeb's Arabic Calligraphy. Art bookbindery, Canada.

== See also ==
- Iraqi art
- Islamic art
- Islamic calligraphy
- List of Iraqi artists
