= Muhammad Sa'id al-Sakkar =

Iraqi poet and calligrapher (1934–2014)

Muhammad Sa'id Saggar
- Born: 25 April 1934; Miqdadiyah, Iraq
- Died: 24 March 2014 (aged 79); Paris, France
- Occupations: Poet and calligrapher
- Organization: Union of Iraqi Writers

Muhammad Sa'id al-Saggar (Arabic: محمد سعيد الصكار) (French: Mohammed Saïd Saggar) (born 25 April 1934, Miqdadiyah) was an Iraqi poet and calligrapher. He was born in Miqdadiyah in the Diyala Governorate in 1934. He used to be a painter; he ran a publishing house in Paris since 1978, and had been a journalist since 1955. He published his literature and critical articles in many newspapers and magazines. He published over 14 books of poetry, theatre, short story, linguistics, art, and other disciplines. He is arguably the most distinguished Iraqi artist-calligrapher in the 21st century. al-Saggar died in Paris on March 23, 2014.

== Life ==
al-Saggar was born in 1934 in Miqdadiyah, east of Baghdad, but grew up in Basra, a governate in southern Iraq. Basra remained visible in al-Saggar's works, starting with his first poetry collection Rain (1962) and An Orange in the Surah of Water (1968), as well as his many paintings, which made him a prominent present-day calligrapher and artisan. The Iraqi artist has resided in France since 1978; he chose it when he was forced into exile and had more time to work on his art works in his studio. In his long professional career, al-Saggar practiced journalism as an editor, calligrapher, and designer since 1955.

== Works ==
His collections of poetry include:

- Rain; 1962
- An Orange in the Surah of Water; 1968
- The Complete Works of Poetry
- A Collection in French; 1995

His publications include:

- Arabic Calligraphy for Youth
- The Days of Abd al-Haqq al-Baghdadi
- The Pen and What Has Been Written
- The Plight of Mahmoud al-Shahid

== Awards ==
al-Saggar has received several awards, most notably the Architectural Heritage Award, which he received in recognition of his design of the Mecca Gate. The Arab World Institute honored al-Saggar on 17 March. "[al-Sakkar was] one of the most outstanding representatives of modern Arabic calligraphy," said Jack Lang, President of the Arab World Institute and former French Minister of Culture.

al-Saggar created the "Focused Arabic Alphabet" 40 years ago in an attempt to simplify Arabic script for the developments of digital printing systems. Thanks to this innovation, the first informatics applications were launched, enabling computer designers to design various Arabic texts currently in use.
