= Alaa Al-Marjani =

Iraqi photojournalist

- علاء المرجاني
- Born: 1967 (age 58–59); Najaf, Iraq
- Occupation: Photojournalist
- Employer(s): Associated Press, Reuters

Alaa Al-Marjani (Arabic: علاء المرجاني; born 1967) is an Iraqi photojournalist from the city of Najaf who worked for Associated Press and is currently working with Reuters. He covered the event of the US invasion of Iraq in 2003, the civil war that followed the invasion, ISIS's occupation of northern and western Iraq, and the liberation of the city of Mosul from that organization.

== Life and career ==
Alaa hails from a religious family. His father, the writer, preacher Sheikh Haider Saleh Al-Marjani Al-Khuza’i (1927-1997), studied at the Hawza in holy Najaf and was interested in writing encyclopedic books about Najaf and its figures, including the books: “The Preachers of the Al-Minbar Al-Husseini”, “An-Najaf Al-Ashraf in the Past and Now”, "Fragments from the life of As-Sadiq", "Personalities of Najaf", "Nuggets of Etiquette and Morals", "Nuggets from the Literature of the Revolution", and "History of Alawi Shrine".

His interest in photography appeared, after his father presented him with a toy in the form of a camera after returning from the Hajj, which contained pictures of scenes of the Great Mosque of Mecca and Medina, and asked him to give him a real camera the next time. This passion turned into a search for the aesthetics of photography when he was looking at the faces of visitors coming from different countries and regions to visit the shrine of Imam Ali and Islamic monuments in the holy city of Najaf. In the 1990s, he began photographing the campaigns of foreign pilgrims coming to visit his city and the neighboring holy city of Karbala. Relying on himself, through trial and error, he acquired the skill of photography and knowledge of the basics of photography, then turned professional and went into the world.

After the United States and its allies invaded Iraq and overthrew Saddam Hussein's regime in 2003, Al-Marjani found his opportunity to join the ranks of the Western press. He joined the Associated Press and later to Reuters. He was assigned to photograph in a hostile-environment, the major events that followed this invasion of the civil war in the hot spots in Baghdad and Fallujah. He photographed the armed confrontations between Jaish Al-Mahdi Militia and the American forces in Najaf, and documented the tragedy of the displaced after ISIS occupied vast areas in western and northern Iraq and documented the extent of the devastation that afflicted the city of Mosul after its liberation, and his lens documented the unrests that resulted in the resignation of the government of Adel Abdul Mahdi in 2019, and documented COVID-19 pandemic and its repercussions on Iraqi society.

== Exhibitions and awards ==
Al-Marjani participated in many exhibitions inside and outside Iraq, most notably:

- An exhibition at the Paris Opera and Lyon, France.
- Certificate of Appreciation for holding the exhibition (Iraq is the Country of Civilizations), presented by the Iraqi Photographers Association in Sweden and the Association of Photographers in Europe and America.
- The second prize in the Arab-European Festival on the lives of the displaced Iraqis, held in Hamburg, Germany.
- An international award from the American Detroit Institute for Free Media. This award is given to the best picture accompanying a story written in a foreign newspaper.
- Silver medal in the photography competition organized by the Arab Federation of Arab Photographers in Europe.
- Creativity Shield and a Certificate of Appreciation from the Iraqi Cultural House in Najaf.
- An exhibition in London about the liberation of the Popular Mobilization Forces for the areas controlled by the ISIS.
- A personal exhibition on the Assyrian, Babylonian, Sumerian and Akkadian civilizations in Iraq at the headquarters of the French Embassy in Baghdad on the occasion of the French National Day.
