= Ibrahim Rashid =

Iraqi-Swedish-Canadian multidisciplinary artist

- Born: 1957 (age 68–69); Baghdad, Iraq
- Education: Academy of Fine Arts, Baghdad (1982)
- Known for: Painting, drawing, woodcut printmaking, video, installation
- Notable work: Unknown Epic (1980); Looking for Oxygen (2008–2012)
- Partner: Maha Mustafa
- Website: https://www.ibrahim-rashid.com

Ibrahim Rashid (born 1957, Baghdad, Iraq) is an Iraqi-Swedish-Canadian multidisciplinary artist based between Toronto, Canada, and Malmö, Sweden. His practice spans painting, drawing, woodcut printmaking, video, and installation. His work has been exhibited internationally including at the Mori Art Museum in Tokyo, the Sharjah Biennial, Darat al Funun in Amman, and the Art Gallery of Burlington in Ontario. His video installation Looking for Oxygen was reviewed in Hyperallergic following its presentation at the Mori Art Museum, Tokyo, in 2012.

== Early life and education ==
Rashid was born in Baghdad in 1957 into a family with a political and literary background. In 1975 he joined Tariq al-Shaab ("People's Path"), Iraq's Marxist newspaper, where he worked alongside poets and writers. When the paper was banned and its contributors persecuted, he later worked with poets Shafiq al-Kamali and Hamid Saeed at Afaq Arabiya.

He graduated from the Academy of Fine Arts in Baghdad in 1982. The academy was the country's pre-eminent art institution, founded in part by Faiq Hassan (1914–1987), the pioneering figure of modern Iraqi painting who had studied at the École des Beaux-Arts in Paris and established the painting department on his return to Baghdad. Rashid studied under Hassan directly, as well as under the Polish professor Roman Artymowski, a central figure in modern Iraqi printmaking.

Rashid belongs to what has been described as the "eighties generation" of Iraqi artists — those who studied and exhibited in Baghdad during the 1980s under the conditions of war, censorship, and authoritarian control. During this period he worked as an illustrator for national magazines and newspapers, publishing art that critiqued sociopolitical realities under the ruling regime. He served on the warfront during the Gulf War. He immigrated to Sweden in 1991, settling in Malmö with his partner, the artist Maha Mustafa. He relocated partly to Toronto in 2005.

In Sweden he expanded his practice through studies in Screen Printing (Malmö, 1999) and Digital Art in Public Space (Malmö, 1996).

== Work ==
Rashid works across painting, drawing, woodcut printmaking, video, and installation. His work addresses exile, the erasure of cultural memory, ecological devastation, the human body under political systems, and the effects of war and authoritarianism. He also works as an art critic and writer. His essay Art and Environment or The Game of Burning Stones was published in the exhibition catalogue Beyond 100°C at Darat al Funun in 2004.

The Art Gallery of Burlington described his practice as engaging "sociopolitical themes, focusing on the land and human beings both as political bodies through radical and mythological imagery."

== Selected Works ==
=== Unknown Epic (1980) ===
An eight-metre woodcut panorama of mythological figures, produced during his studies at the Academy of fine arts in Baghdad. The work was removed by authorities within a day of being displayed. Five years later it received the Iraqi Art Critics First Prize.

=== Hamlet in Prehistoric Times: To Be or Not to Be! (1980) ===
A scenographic commission for an early Iraqi production of Hamlet, directed by Salah al-Qasab. The immersive set transformed a 20 × 10 metre space — walls, ceiling, and floor — using spray-painted grain sacks from Baghdad's Shorja markets, drawing on Mesopotamian traditions, cave art, and cinema.

=== Landscape in Process (2005–2012) ===
A series of large-scale paintings created for Santiago Calatrava's Turning Torso in Malmö, a 54-storey residential tower completed in 2005 in the city's Western Harbour district. Rashid completed commissions connected to the tower in 2005, 2006, and 2012.

=== Fragile Absolute Landscape (2004–2007) ===
A three-channel video installation projected simultaneously on three adjacent walls (600 × 400 cm), first developed during a residency at Darat al Funun in Amman in 2004. It was subsequently shown at YYZ Artists' Outlet, Toronto (2006), and the 8th Sharjah Biennial (2007).

=== Looking for Oxygen (2008–2012) ===
A video installation showing a figure submerged at the bottom of an indoor swimming pool with black plastic bags taped around the head and torso, shown alongside an animation relating brain oxygen levels to bodily movement. Reviewing the work at the Mori Art Museum for Hyperallergic, Christopher Kuhl described it as "a frightening metaphor for the psychological result of nonstop anti-Arab hatred". The work was shown at Södertälje Konsthall (2008), Passagen Konsthall, Linköping (2009), A Space Gallery, Toronto (2010), MAI Gallery, Montréal (2011), and the Mori Art Museum, Tokyo (2012), as part of Arab Express: The Latest Art from the Arab World.

=== I Dive into the Well of My Body (2016) ===
A series of large-scale acrylic paintings on canvas (200 × 160 cm) addressing identity, migration, and the effects of conflict on the human body.

=== Big Bang (2020–present) ===
A series of large-scale acrylic paintings begun during the COVID-19 pandemic. Rashid has described the works as merging human, animal, and mechanical forms across time, drawing on myth, bodily fragility, and the legacy of war.

=== I Am Not a Heroic Fish (1982–2023) ===
A long-term series of ink drawings on paper begun during wartime in the 1980s and continued over four decades, depicting bodies, soldiers, and landscapes and blending anthropomorphism and machinery to address the physical and psychological effects of conflict.

=== Resistance to Erasure (2025–2026) ===
A large-scale mixed-media exhibition using drawing, painting, collage, and woodcut printmaking, exploring power, identity, and memory within systems of political control. It was shown at the Art Gallery of Burlington, Ontario, from November 2025 to February 2026. Rashid has described the project as an effort to resist "the loss, distortion, and marginalization of collective and personal history".

== Public Commissions ==
- 2012 — Landscape in Process, large-scale mural, Eriksberg, Sweden
- 2011 — Poetic Moments, public art bench, Burlington, Canada (winning commission)
- 2006 — Landscape in Process II, Turning Torso, Malmö, Sweden
- 2005 — Landscape in Process I, Turning Torso, Malmö, Sweden
- 2003 — What About My Garden, Turning Torso, Malmö, Sweden (winning commission)
- 2000 — Northern Landscapes II, City of Kiruna Hospital, Kiruna, Sweden
- 1999 — Process, Lomma Library, Lomma, Sweden
- 1996 — Music Rooms II, General Hospital, Malmö, Sweden (winning commission)
- 1994 — Music Rooms I, Municipality of Malmö, Sweden (winning commission)

== Selected Exhibitions ==
=== Group ===
- 2025 — Art Gallery of Burlington, Ontario — Earth Fingers
- 2025 — 19th International Architecture Exhibition, Venice Biennale, Italy
- 2012 — Mori Art Museum, Tokyo — Arab Express: The Latest Art from the Arab World
- 2011 — KW|ag 5th Biennial, Kitchener, Canada — Monochromatic
- 2007 — Sharjah Biennial 8, UAE — Art, Ecology & The Politics of Change: Still Life
- 2004 — Darat al Funun, Amman, Jordan — Beyond 100°C
- 2001–2002 — Stroke of Genius, Brunei Gallery and Kufa Gallery, London; Faulconer Gallery, Iowa
- 1997 — Malmö Art Museum, Sweden

=== Solo ===
- 2027 — Ronneby Konsthall, Ronneby, Sweden — Art Endures Through Metaphor
- 2025–2026 — Art Gallery of Burlington, Ontario — Resistance to Erasure
- 2014 — Gallery Svalunda, Malmö — In Process
- 2011 — MAI (Montréal, arts interculturels) Gallery, Montréal — Looking for Oxygen
- 2010 — ASpace Gallery, Toronto — A Moment Before You Close Your Eyes
- 2008 — Södertälje Konsthall, Sweden — Ground Zero
- 2007 — Trollhättan Konsthall, Sweden — Checkpoint X
- 2006 — YYZ Artists' Outlet, Toronto — The Fragile Absolute Landscape
- 2004 — Darat al Funun, Amman, Jordan — Beyond 100°C
- 1998 — Barbacka Konsthall, Kristianstad, Sweden

== Publications ==
- Arab Express: The Latest Art from the Arab World, Mori Art Museum, Tokyo, 2012. ISBN 978-4-582-20670-8
- Still Life: Art, Ecology & the Politics of Change, Part I, Sharjah Biennial 8, ed. Serene Huleileh, 2007. ISBN 9948-04-328-6
- Checkpoint X, texts by Dan Jönsson and Clemens Altgård, Sweden, 2006. ISBN 91-631-6819-7
- Beyond 100°C, Darat al Funun — The Khalid Shoman Foundation, 2004

== Grants and Awards ==
- 2025 — Canada Council for the Arts, Arts Abroad — Venice Biennale, Canada
- 2024 — Toronto Arts Council, Creation Grant, Canada
- 2012 — Ontario Arts Council, Creation Grant, Canada
- 2011 — Iaspis, Swedish Arts Grants Committee International Programme, Sweden
- 2010 — Ontario Arts Council, Creation Grant, Canada
- 2007 — Canada Council for the Arts, Canada
- 2005 — Swedish National Council for Culture, Sweden
- 2005 — Copenhagen AMT and Skov Art Centre International Grant, Denmark
- 1987 — 5th Wasiti Biennale Painting Award, Baghdad, Iraq
- 1985 — Iraqi Art Critics First Prize, Baghdad, Iraq
