= Faraj Abbo =

Iraqi-Assyrian artist and theatre director

- Born: Faraj Abbo al Numan; 21 November 1921; Mosul, Mandatory Iraq
- Died: 5 March 1984 (aged 62); Baghdad, Iraqi Republic
- Education: Baghdad Central Secondary School (1939); College of Fine Arts, Baghdad (1950); Academy of Fine Arts, Rome (1954)
- Known for: Painter, theatre director, designer, author and educator
- Website: Official website

Faraj Abbo al Numan (Arabic: فرج عبو النعمان; November 21, 1921 – March 5, 1984), more commonly Faraj Abu, Faraj Aboo or simply Faraj Abou, was an influential Assyrian Iraqi artist, theatre director, designer, author and educator, noted as one of the early artists to integrate Arabic script into his abstract paintings and who achieved international recognition for his artwork.

== Life and career ==
Faraj Abbo was born on 21 November 1921 in Mosul. His artistic talents were evident at a very young age. At 13 years, he was commissioned to produce paintings for local churches in Mosul; such as the work now in Mar Eshai Church.

He received his early art education at the Baghdad Central Secondary School in 1939. He taught Art at Al Hilah High School in Al Hilah, Iraq, as well as the Teachers Centre in Baquba until 1945. He completed a Bachelor of Fine Arts degree at the College of Fine Arts – Painting Department in Cairo in Egypt, graduating in 1950. He then travelled to Rome to undertake post-graduate studies, and attained a Diploma in Art from the Academy of Fine Arts in 1954 which was awarded with the highest degree of honour.

After returning to Baghdad, he was instrumental in founding the Institute of Fine Arts (which was later renamed the Academy of Fine Arts and became a department within the University of Baghdad) and was among the first group of Faculty members at the Institute. He headed the Department of Plastic Art and was Deputy Dean for many terms. Much later, in the 1970s, he taught drawing at Baghdad University's Architectural Department.

Abbo was very active in Iraq's arts community. He joined the Friends of Art Committee in Baghdad in 1941 - Iraq's first formal art society, modelled on European art groups. He also became an early member of the Baghdad Modern Art Group formed by Jawad Saleem and Shakir Hassan Al Said in 1951; a group that sought to inspire a sense of national identity by combining Iraqi heritage within the framework of modern abstract art. As a result of his involvement with the Baghdad Modern Art Group, his academic style was gradually transformed into a more abstract style. His early artwork was based on themes of popular culture and everyday life. He abandoned figurative representation and started to study Arabic script and Islamic geometric style, which he incorporated into his artworks from the 1970s. His later works, which the art critic, Jabra Ibrahim Jabra, considered as his finest were inspired by arabesque and the nobility of Arabic script.

He married in 1960 and had three children, two daughters and a son. Amal, the eldest daughter is married and living in Los Angeles, USA. She has two sons George Mouwafaq Gharib and Peter Mouwafaq Gharib. The second daughter, Shetha, lives in Doha, Qatar, and has followed in her father's footsteps by becoming an artist and a writer. His youngest son, Faris, lives in Los Angeles with his wife, son Christopher Michael, and Daughter Dilana Shakay.

Faraj Abbo al Numan died in Baghdad on the 5 March 1984.

== Work ==
Faraj Abbo is often remembered as the painter who always wore a suit, even while working. He is among a small group of post-war Iraqi artists who won international recognition Yet, his work is difficult to classify. In his early career, he was noted for portraiture, but in his later career, he became known for work that was distinctly Iraqi and abstract.

He authored a specialized book in fine arts, The Elements of Art, published by Dolphin Publishing Company in 1984 (two volumes in Arabic), which became a basic reference for art students and researchers.

He participated in more than 60 exhibitions and his work is part of the permanent collections of prestigious galleries and institutions, including: Baghdad University, Baghdad Airport, and the Jordan National Gallery, Amman.

=== Select list of paintings ===
- Islamic Abstract Ornamentation oil on canvas, 1970s
- Islamic Abstract Calligraphy oil on canvas, 1980s

== See also ==
- Hurufiyya movement
- Iraqi art
- List of Iraqi artists
