= Khalid al-Jader =

- Born: 1922; Baghdad, Iraq
- Died: 2 December 1988 (aged 65–66); Riyadh, Saudi Arabia
- Education: College of Law, Baghdad; Institute of Fine Art, Baghdad; École nationale supérieure des Beaux-Arts, Paris (1954); Riyadh University, Saudi Arabis, (1970s)
- Known for: Painter, administrator and educator
- Movement: Impressionist

Khalid al-Jader (1922–1988) was an Iraqi artist, administrator and scholar. In terms of his artwork, he is seen as a precursor to modern abstract art in Iraq.

== Life and career ==
Khalid al-Jader was born in Baghdad in 1922.

He attended the Middle Eastern School in Baghdad. In 1937, while still a secondary school student, he began to contribute drawings in Chinese ink to the new literary magazine Al-Naba'a published by writer, Ahmed Hussein Al-Mahdawi. This was to be the beginning of his career as an artist. He studied at the College of Law and art at the Institute of Fine Art concurrently, graduating in 1946 with degrees in both art and law.

In 1947, after graduating from arts school, he obtained a position teaching painting at the Adhamiya High School. However his mother had wanted him to pursue a career in law and he did not want to disappoint her. Each morning, he would come out carrying a satchel to give the impression that he was going off to court, when, he was in fact, going to teach at the local school.

Khalid al-Jader travelled to Paris on scholarship to study at the École Nationale Supérieure des Beaux-Arts in 1954 and earned a Ph.D. in the History of Islamic Art from the Sorbonne. The title of his dissertation was, "The Medieval Iraqi Manuscripts in the National Library of Paris." While in Paris, al-Jader developed a lifelong passion for the Impressionists and joined the Salon de Paris.

On returning to Baghdad, al-Jader accepted the position of Dean of the Institute of Fine Arts; a position he held for several years. In 1962 under the supervision of the President of Baghdad University, he founded the Academy of Fine Arts along with his colleagues Dr. Aziz Shalal Aziz and Dr. As'ad Abdul Razak, and later became its Dean. As an administrator, he was "meticulous." Through these administrative activities, al-Jader advanced the professionalisation of art education in Iraq.

He was an active participant in the Iraqi modern art movement, especially through his involvement in Iraq's various art groups. He recognised the value of art societies while still at secondary school, when he joined the Al-Da'ad National Society at the Middle Eastern School, where he attended. In his adult life, he held several prominent positions and memberships in art institutions and organizations including the Pioneers Group and the Impressionists Group. He also joined the Society of Iraqi Plastic Artists, and for a time was the Head of Society of Iraqi Artists.

He spent much of his later life travelling. In the late 1960s, he travelled to Berlin where he spent two years on a research project. In the early 1970s, he moved Saudi Arabia where he studied at the Riyadh University. In the early 1980s, he travelled to Rabat in Morocco to work as a teacher at the Higher Institute of Journalism. In Morocco, he travelled extensively throughout the country, visiting the cities of Fez, Meknès, Casablanca and Tetouan where he continually sketched the locations and people.

He died on 2 December 1988 in Riyadh, Saudi Arabia, following heart surgery.

== Work ==
He exhibited his work extensively; showing them in France, Germany, Saudi Arabia, Poland, Russia, Poland, and Denmark.

His subject matter was drawn from everyday life; markets, streets and villages - all populated with human figures going about their daily lives. His style has been described as "impressionistic" His use of thick brushstrokes and chaotic canvasess give his work a certain abstract character. For this reason, he is often called a "precursor to abstract art" in Iraq.

== See also ==
- Iraqi art
- List of Iraqi artists
