= Nedim Kufi =

Dutch painter

- Born: 1966 (age 59–60); Baghdad, Iraq
- Known for: Painter, print-maker and graphic designer
- Movement: Contemporary art
- Website: Official website for Nedim Kufi

Nedim Kufi (also known as Nadem al-Kufi), born 1962 in Baghdad), is an Iraqi-Dutch multi disciplinary visual artist. He is primarily known for conceptual art that explores themes such as war, political conflict, exile, loss, and historical memory. Much of his work contains autobiographical elements. He is also a graphic designer and print maker.

== Life and career ==
Kufi was born 1962 in Baghdad, Iraq and spent his early childhood there. He studied at the Bagdhad Institute of Fine Arts, graduating in 1985. He served in the Iraqi military during the Iran–Iraq War, and was deeply affected by the atrocities he witnessed.

He left Iraq in 1990 and settled in the Netherlands in 1994 and studied graphic design there. He now divides his time between the Netherlands and Cairo.

Since 2004, he has published the monthly Daftar, an e-publication that features succinct works by artists and writers.

== Work ==
As with many Iraqi artists now living in exile, Kufi's art explores themes such as war and its aftermath, political conflict, exile, loss, and historical memory. Much of his work contains autobiographical elements. He is a multi-disciplinary artist, working as a painter, graphic designer and print maker. He has had more than 20 solo exhibitions, and has been included in scores of group exhibitions that feature leading Iraqi artists of the post-independence period.

Select list of exhibitions

- 2003 Dafatir: Contemporary Iraqi Book Art curated by Nada Shabout, United States travelling exhibition (group)
- 2003 Garden Of Eden, The Phatory, New York, USA (Group Show)
- 2003 Earth and Ink, Gallery 108, Boston, USA (Solo)
- 2006 Attar in Beirut, Espace SD Gallery, Beirut and Lebanon (Solo)
- 2006 The Iraqi Equation, (group)
- 2007 Rasheed street | Mediamatic | ELHEMA| Amsterdam | Netherlands (Group)
- 2008 Soap & Silence, La Fountain Gallery, Bahrain (Solo)
- 2008–2009 Iraqi Artists in Exile, [With 14 other notable Iraqi artists including Shakir Hasan Al Said, Dia Azzawi] and Hanaa Malallah; curated by Alan Schnitger, Station Museum of Contemporary Art, Houston, 1 November 2008 – 1 February 2009

Select list of artworks

- Horse, manipulated digital print, 2008
- Empty, manipulated digital print, 2008

== See also ==
- Culture of Iraq
- Islamic art
- List of graphic designers
- List of Iraqi artists
- List of Iraqi women artists
