= Mahmoud Obaidi =

Iraqi-Canadian artist (born 1966)

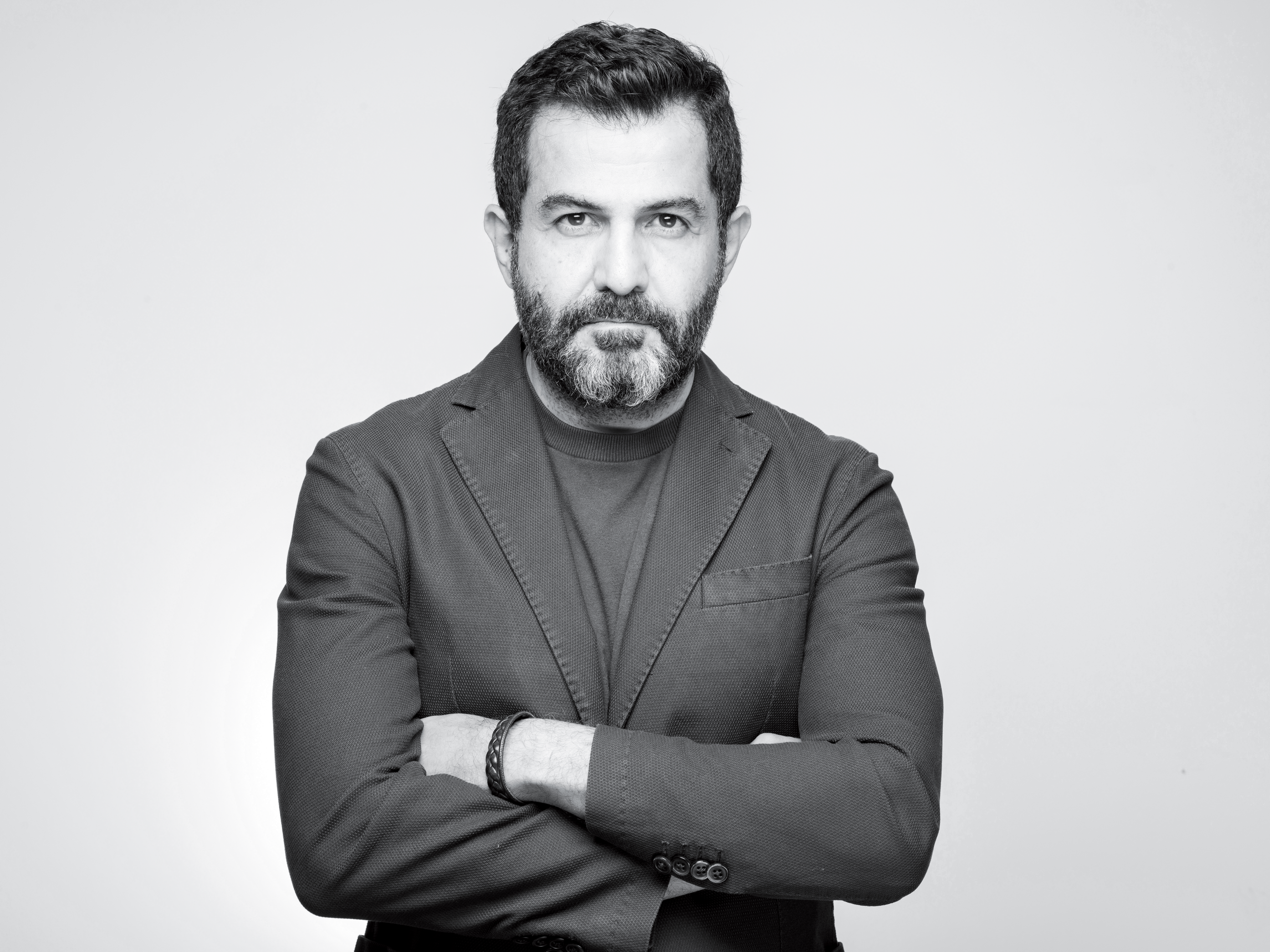
- Obaidi in 2016
- Born: 1966 (age 59–60); Baghdad, Iraq
- Education: University of Guelph, Ontario; HIF Film Academy, Los Angeles; Ryerson University, Toronto
- Known for: Contemporary Artist; Iraqi Contemporary Artist
- Website: www.obaidiart.com

Mahmoud Obaidi (born in Baghdad, Iraq in 1966) is an Iraqi-Canadian artist whose work has been exhibited in museums and galleries around the world.

== Life and career ==
Mahmoud Obaidi was born in Baghdad in 1966. He obtained a degree in fine arts from the Baghdad University in 1990. Like many Iraqi intellectuals and artists, he fled his war-torn country in 1991. After settling in Canada, he obtained his Master's of Fine Arts at the University of Guelph in Canada. He also obtained diplomas in new media and film from Toronto and Los Angeles.

He had his first international solo exhibition in 1995. His work has been exhibited extensively including at Qatar Museums Gallery, Doha; Mathaf: Arab Museum of Modern Art, Doha; Saatchi Gallery, London; the National Museum of Bahrain; the Institut du Monde Arabe, Paris; the National Gallery of Fine Arts, Amman; Station Museum of Contemporary Art, Texas; and the Musée d’Art Contemporain de Baie-Saint-Paul, Quebec, among others. His work is part of the permanent collection of a number of significant museums, foundations, and private collections.

== Work ==
The artist’s work is held in several permanent collections including Mathaf: Arab Museum of Modern Art, Doha; the National Gallery of Fine Arts, Amman; the Sharjah Art Museum, Sharjah; the Musée d’Art Contemporain de Baie-Saint-Paul, Quebec; the Museum of Modern Art, Baghdad and the British Museum, London.

Select list of artworks

- Baghdad Manifesto
- Compact Home Project 2003-2004
- Remains of a Ravaged City, 2015
- Operation Iraqi Freedom Family, 2016
- Fragments, 2016

Select list of exhibitions

- 2016 Fragments: An Exhibition by Mahmoud Obaidi, Qatar Museums Gallery, Katara, Doha
- 2016 Fair Skies, Mathaf: Arab Museum of Modern Art, Doha
- 2016 Baghdad Manifesto, Saatchi Gallery, London
- 2015 The Imposter, 56th Venice Biennale, Venice
- 2014 The Replacement, Meem Gallery, Dubai and Contemporary Art Platform, Kuwait City
- 2013 Contemporary Arab Art: How Do You Sleep at Night?, Meem Gallery, Dubai and Abu Dhabi Art, Abu Dhabi
- 2013 The Cubes – Hajj: The Journey Through Art, Museum of Islamic Art, Doha
- 2013 Dress Code, Abu Dhabi Music and Arts Foundation, Abu Dhabi
- 2013 Confusionism, Katara Art Centre, Doha
- 2012 Fair Skies – 25 years of Arab Creativity,
- 2013 Fair Skies – 25 Years of Arab Creativity, travelling exhibition National Museum of Bahrain, Manama (2013); Institut du Monde Arabe, Paris (2012); Fair Skies, Agial Art Gallery and Art Dubai, Dubai (2012)
- 2011 Gigabytes of My Memory – Art in Iraq Today, Meem Gallery, Dubai, and Beirut Exhibition Centre, Beirut
- 2010 They Welcomed Us with Flowers, Bastakiya Art Fair, Dubai
- 2010 My Homeland, Art Sawa Gallery, Dubai
- 200 Beyond the War: Contemporary Iraqi Artists of the Diaspora, LTHM Gallery, New York
- 2009 Turtles – Iraqi Artists in Exile, Station Museum of Contemporary Art, Houston, Texas
- 2009 Modernism and Iraq, Wallach Art Gallery, Columbia University, New York
- 2006 Golden Leaves Book, Gallery Jouy, Switzerland, and T Cazacrou Foundation, Frankfurt
- 2005 Dafatir: Contemporary Iraqi Book Art, University of North Texas Art Gallery, Denton and other locations (travelling exhibition)
- 2005 Improvisation: Seven Iraqi Artists, Bissan Gallery, Doha, Al-Riwaq Gallery, Manama, and 4 Walls Gallery, Amman
- 2005 Paris–Baghdad: Iraqi Artists, Musée du Montparnasse, Paris
- 2003 Iraqi Art Now: Looking Out, Looking In, De Paul Art Museum, Chicago
- 2002 The Ramona Project, 4 Walls Gallery, Amman
- 1998 The Dome Project, Zavitz Gallery, Toronto and Public Art, India
- 1994 Obaidi, Darat Al Funun, Amman
- 1990 Cats’ Factory, Museum of Modern Art, Baghdad

== See also ==
- Iraqi art
- Islamic art
- List of Iraqi artists
