= Inferences from a Sabre =

Claudio Magris' first work of narrative fiction

- Book cover of the first edition released on 1 January 1984, made by illustrator Gabriele Mucchi
- Author: Claudio Magris
- Original title: Illazione su una sciabola
- Cover artist: Gabriele Mucchi
- Language: Italian
- Publication date: 1 January 1984
- Publication place: Italy

Illazioni su una sciabola (Note: English: Inferences from a Sabre) is a novella by the Italian writer and scholar Claudio Magris. First published in 1984, it was Magris's first work of narrative fiction. The book combines historical material, fictional narration, documentary research, testimony and philosophical reflection to reconstruct the story of the Kosakenland in Carnia in northeastern Italy during the final stages of World War II, focusing particularly on the Cossack leader Pyotr Krasnov.

== Background ==
"Illazioni su una sciabola" first appeared in the Rivista milanese di economia (Note: English: The Milanese Economics Magazine) in early 1984 and was subsequently published in installments in the Trieste newspaper Il Piccolo. It was then issued in book form by Cariplo-Laterza in 1984–1985, followed by an edition from Studio Tesi in 1986 and editions from Garzanti. The work has also been translated into other languages. An English translation by Mark Thompson, titled Inferences from a Sabre, was published by Polygon in Edinburgh in 1990 and by George Braziller in the United States in 1991.

Claudio Magris got his inspiration partly from the work "La Terra Impossibile".

== Plot ==
The narrative takes the form of a long letter written by an elderly retired priest, Don Guido, to another priest. Through testimony, recollection and conjecture, Don Guido attempts to reconstruct the history of the Cossack forces who occupied parts of Carnia in 1944–1945 and their leader, Pyotr Krasnov.

Krasnov, an émigré Cossack leader and former White Army general, occupies a central position in the narrative. After the German defeat, the Cossacks withdrew toward Austria and surrendered to British forces before being handed over to Soviet authorities. Krasnov was subsequently executed in the Soviet Union in 1947. The central mystery of the book concerns competing accounts of Krasnov's final fate. The narrator encounters evidence, including a sabre associated with a Cossack grave, that prompts him to consider an alternative reconstruction of events. Rather than treating the historical record as definitively closed.

== Analysis ==
Ernestina Pellegrini's study of the work emphasizes the connection between Magris's childhood memories of seeing Cossacks in the Trieste and Friuli area and his later transformation of those memories into narrative. She argues that the work deliberately combines historical material with memory, testimony and imaginative reconstruction. Ulla Musarra Schrøder places Illazioni su una sciabola within Magris's broader treatment of history and memory. She argues that, in Magris's historical narratives, memory can precede the reconstruction of historical events, producing a representation of the past that is simultaneously personal, collective and documentary but not necessarily accurate. Tamas Dobozy argues that Magris's early novels, including Inferences from a Sabre, deliberately combine genres such as biography, autobiography, letters, fiction, philosophical writing, scholarship and historiography. According to Dobozy, these shifts between genres challenge stable systems of knowledge and create a form of writing positioned between certainty and doubt.

Kirkus Reviews called it a hybrid novel and characterized it as a lightly fictionalized investigation of real people and events, while Publishers Weekly described it as a novella built around a historical episode and the memories of its elderly narrator. Krasnov's search for a Cossack homeland provides the book with a recurring meditation on exile, political identity and the relationship between imagined and actual territory. Later scholarship on Magris's treatment of diaspora describes the Cossack settlement toward the imagined "Cossack homeland" in Carnia as a source for the book's reflection on the impossibility of possessing a stable homeland or definitive historical identity.

== Reviews ==
The English translation received reviews in the American publishing press. Kirkus Reviews praised the book's historical and philosophical ambitions while noting that its ideas could overshadow its characters. Publishers Weekly similarly emphasized the book's irony and its use of an uncertain historical record as a vehicle for questions about history, literature and faith.

A Corriere della Sera essay on Magris's works identifies Krasnov in Illazioni su una sciabola as one of the biographical figures through whom Magris explores the relationship between testimony, history and narrative.

== Author retrospective ==
In a 1995 essay about the book Magris pointed out the difference between his work and Sgorlon's Army Of The Lost Rivers, stating that whilst Sgorlon's book made the events of Kosakenland the background of its story, according to himself, he had approached the topic more accademically.

In a 2025 interview with Corriere della Sera, Magris recalled that his interest in Krasnov's fate originated partly in his childhood memories of seeing Cossacks in Friuli and in his own earlier newspaper writing about the subject. He also recalled discussing the subject with Jorge Luis Borges, who encouraged him to turn the material into a literary work.

== Editions ==
- Magris, Claudio. Illazioni su una sciabola. Milan: Cariplo-Laterza, 1984–1985.
- Magris, Claudio. Illazioni su una sciabola. Pordenone: Studio Tesi, 1986.
- Magris, Claudio. Illazioni su una sciabola. Milan: Garzanti, 1992.
- Magris, Claudio. Inferences from a Sabre. Translated by Mark Thompson. Edinburgh: Polygon, 1990.
- Magris, Claudio. Inferences from a Sabre. New York: George Braziller, 1991.
