= Susan Lark =

American medical doctor

Susan Lark is a medical doctor. She obtained her education from Northwestern Medical School and has served as one of the clinical faculty members at Stanford University. At Stanford University, she taught in the department of family and community medicine.

== Career ==
Lark is the founder and director of the Menopause Self Help Center located in Los Altos, California. She believes that maintaining a slightly alkaline body pH will lead to the prevention of diseases such as osteoporosis. Susan Lark is developing nutritional supplements for women's health. Her most recent book is Hormone Revolution; it was written with Kimberly S. Day.

== See also ==
- Halla Ayla
- Zain Kenderian
