= The World is a Stage: Stories behind Pictures =

The World is a Stage: Stories behind Pictures was an art exhibition held at the Mori Art Museum, Roppongi Hills Mori Tower 53F, Tokyo, Japan, from 29 March to 19 June 2005

"This exhibition examines how in contemporary art, fiction, fantasy or narrative have recently become an important medium through which artists describe, exorcise or critique a real world which seems full of conflict and anxiety."- David Elliot, Director, Mori Art Museum

== Artists ==
- Eija-Liisa Ahtila (Finland)
- Jananne Al-Ani ( UK)
- Gregory Crewdson (USA)
- Stefan Exler (Germany)
- Teresa Hubbard / Alexander Birchler (USA/Switzerland)
- Leiko Ikemura (Japan / Germany)
- William Kentridge (South Africa)
- Konoike Tomoko (Japan)
- Tracey Moffatt (Australia)
- Odani Motohiko (Japan)
- Anneè Olofsson (Sweden)
- Kara Walker (USA)
- Mark Wallinger (UK)
- Karen Yasinsky (USA)

== Curators ==
- Natsumi Araki Curator
- Kenichi Kondo Assistant Curator
