= Salima Salih =

Iraqi author, translator, artist (born 1942)

- Born: 1942 (age 83–84) Mosul, Iraq
- Occupation: Writer, translator, painter, digital artist, photographer
- Language: Arabic, English, German, Spanish, Persian, Malayalam
- Education: Bachelor's degree in law; Doctorate degree in journalism
- Alma mater: Institute of Fine Arts; University of Baghdad; University of Leipzig
- Genre: Short story, novel, literary articles

Website
- salima-salih.com

Salima Salih (Arabic: سالمة صالح; born 1942) is an Iraqi short story writer, translator, and artist, from the city of Mosul. She is well known for her articles that advocate human rights, especially women's rights. She has published many of literary works, including a novel, The Year of Cancer, and a collection of short stories, The Transformations. She wrote for Alef Ba’ and Al-Shabab magazines, and was nominated as one of the members of Al-Multaqa prize committee for short Arabic stories.

== Education ==
As a child, Salih was encouraged to read, explore, and express herself freely. Her mother taught her many languages, the names of flowers and herbs, and how to make a garden. Salih's mother also narrated children's tales. Throughout her school years, Salih was inspired by the works of poets Marouf al-Rusafi and Hafez Ibrahim. She memorized hundreds of poems, and took part in a number of poetry competitions. An avid reader, her favorite writers were Mikhail Naima, Abdulaziz Al-Qusi and Sigmund Freud. Salih also loved acting; she wrote a play during her high school years, in which she acted in front of a large audience. Salih published her first story collection at nineteen years old.

After graduating from high school in 1967, Salih enrolled in the Institute of Fine Arts in Baghdad, where she studied painting and music. She learned to play the violin in 1969. Salih studied music for a year and a half, after which she stopped due to the irregularity of lectures at the time, as well as her inability to reach the institute's new campus. In her sixties, Salih finished studying law at the University of Baghdad, and have written two plays, one of which she performed in and was displayed on the television. Additionally, she obtained her Doctorate degree in Journalism from University of Leipzig, in 1986, for her thesis "Global Trends in the Development of Social Media.”

== Career ==
While studying at University of Baghdad, Salih held several positions in the field of journalism. She continued to work in the field for 16 years, from 1961 until 1977. She wrote about freedom and defending women's rights. In 1968, Salih became a writer for Alef Ba magazine; she began contributing to Al-Shabab magazine a year later.

Salih specialized in writing literary fiction and short stories, some of which were published in literary magazines. She had short literary pieces published in Al-Qandil magazine, while others were broadcast over the radio. She also wrote fictional and non-fictional stories for children and young adults. There weren't many publishing houses in Iraq at the time. This meant that the press was solely responsible for publishing and promoting literature. When Salih started writing, she adopted the traditional format to lay out her stories, which consisted of an introduction, body and conclusion. She later shifted to Philosophical Writings, and published her first story collection, The Transformations, despite the restrictions imposed on authors writing in this genre at the time. In 2016, Salih was appointed to the committee of the Al-Multaqa Prize for Short Arabic Stories committee.

Salih translated her works into several languages including English, German, Spanish, Persian, and Malayalam. She also translated several books from German to Arabic.

Salih organized the Nawafid Exhibition, in which she displayed her digital paintings. Through her paintings, Salih set out to emphasize the different elements of nature, even the unpleasant ones, and to make the invisible aspects of life visible. Salih believes that painting and writing poetry are closely interconnected, as her poems inspire the design of her paintings from one end, and that her paintings substitute poetry as a better form of expression from another end.

== Works ==
=== Novels ===
- The Revival (original title: Al-Nuhud), Al-Mada Foundation for Media, Culture and Arts, Baghdad, 1974.
- The Flower of the Prophets (original title: Zahrat Al-Anbiya), Dar Al-Mada for Culture and Publishing, Baghdad, 1994.
- The Abyss (original title: Al-Hawiyah), Manshurat Al-Jamal, Baghdad, 2013.
- The Year of Cancer (original title: Am Al-Sarataan), Manshurat Al-Jamal, Baghdad, 2017. While Salih classified its genre as personal experience, the poet Fadhil Al Azzawi, believed it to be a novel. Even though the first two classifications seem appropriate, Salih suggested classifying her book as a "report, since the book was an account of Salih's struggle with cancer. However, seeing that the book is more literary that biographic, it was agreed to classify the book as autobiographical novel.

=== Story collections ===
- The Transformations (original title: Al-Tahwulat), Arab Writers Union, Damascus, 1974.
- Searching for Trenches (original title: Al-ba’th ’An Al-Khalandiq), Manshurat Al-Jamal, Baghdad, 2006.

=== Translations ===
- Gnosticism in Islam by Heinz Halm (translated title: Al-Ghunusiyah Fi Al-Islam), Manshurat Al-Jamal, Baghdad, 1982.
- The Thirtieth Year by Ingeborg Bachmann (translated title: Al-‘Am Al-Thalathun), Manshurat Al-Jamal, Baghdad, 1998.
- The Friend's Script by Barbara Frischmuth (translated title: Khat Al-Sadiq), Manshurat Al-Jamal, Baghdad, 1998.
- Kassandra by Christa Wolf (translated title: Kassandra), Manshurat Al-Jamal, Baghdad, 1999.
- Experiences Across the River: Women Within the Jordanian and Palestinian Parliaments by Angela Grünert (translated title: Al-Tariq Al-taweel: Al-Nisa’ Fi 'Awal Barlaman Filistini), Manshurat Al-Jamal, Baghdad, 2000.
- Medea. Voices by Christa Wolf (translated title: Mediya. ‘Aswaat), Manshurat Al-Jamal, Baghdad, 2001.
- The Globalized Woman by Christa Wichterich (translated title: Al-Mar’a w’Al-Awlamatu), Manshurat Al-Jamal, Baghdad, 2002.
- Memoirs of an Arabian Princess from Zanzibar by Emily Ruete (translated title: Mudhakiraat Amirah 'Arabiyah), Manshurat Al-Jamal, Baghdad, 2006.
- On the Edge by Markus Werner (translated title: Ala l’Munhadar), Dar Nefro for Publishing and Distribution, Cairo, 2007.
- Theology and Society in the Second and Third Centuries of the Hijra by Josef Van Ess (translated title: Elm Al-Kalam w’Al-Mujtama Fi Al-Qarnayn Al-Thani w’Al-Thalith Lil’Hijrah), Manshurat Al-Jamal, Baghdad, 2008.
- The chapter, The Mirage (translated title: Al-Sarab) from The 9/11 Events Until the Arab Revolutions novel by Thomas Lear (translated title: Ahdath 11 September Li’Ghayit Al-Thawraat Al-‘Arabiya), Goethe-Institut, Baghdad, 2011.

== Other contributions ==
- Reviewed Cat and Mouse, a novel by Günter Grass (translated title: Al-Qit w’Al-Fa’r), Manshurat Al-Jamal, Baghdad, 1961.
- Designed the cover of The Fifth Citadel, a novel by Fadhil Al Azzawi (Arabic translation) (translated title: Al-Qal’a Al-Khamisah), Manshurat Al-Jamal, Baghdad, 2000.
- Designed the cover of Medea. Voices by Christa Wolf (translated title: Mediya. ‘Aswaat), Manshurat Al-Jamal, Baghdad, 2001.
- Designed the cover of The Miracle Maker by Fadhil Al Azzawi (original title: Sane’ Al-Mu’jizat), BOA Editions, New York City, 2003.
- Organized Nawafid Exhibition, Bayt Al-Geira, 9 Dec 2003 – 6 Feb 2004.
- Designed the cover of The Office of Lost Dreams poetry collection by Astrid Rayman (translated title: Maktab Al-Ahlam Al-Mafqudah).
- Designed the cover of Paul Bowles, le Reclus de Tanger by Mohamed Choukri (translated title: Paul Bowles w’Azlatu Tanja), Manshurat Al-Jamal, Baghdad, 2006.
- Photographed the cover photo of The Fifth Citadel novel by Fadhil Al Azzawi (English edition), American University in Cairo Press, Cairo, 2008.
- Designed the cover of The Last of the Angels novel by Fadhil Al Azzawi (English edition) (original title: Akhir Al-Mala’ika), Simon & Schuster, 2008, and the German translation, Dorelman Publishing House, Zurich, 2014.
- Designed the cover of The Traveler and the Innkeeper by Fadhil Al Azzawi (original title: Al-Musafir w’Sahib Al-Manzil), American University in Cairo Press, Cairo, 2011.
- Designed the cover of The Ancestors by Fadhil Al Azzawi (original title: Al-’Aslaf), Manshurat Al-Jamal, Baghdad, 2017.
- Designed the logo of The Garden Poem in Berlin.
- Designed the logo of Al-Hayat Charitable Society, which helps the children of Gaza, in Berlin.
