= La Terra Impossibile =

First Italian historical novel about Kosakenland

- Book cover of the 1991 edition of the book
- Author: Bruna Sibille-Sizia
- Publication date: 1956 (Note: Bruna started writing the book at age 20, in 1947.)
- Publication place: Italy, Udine

La terra impossibile (Note: English: The Impossible Land) (Note: Italian subtitle: Storia dell'armata cosacca in Friuli; English: History of the Cossack Army in Friuli) is a historical novel and partial autobiography by Italian writer Bruna Sibille-Sizia. It was first published in Udine in 1956 by Doretti. The novel is set in Friuli during the final period of World War II and narrates the presence of Cossack formations and their families in the region during the German occupation of northern Italy, and the subsequent establishment of Kosakenland in Carnia. The novel was Sibille-Sizia's first book and its writing started when she was approximately twenty years old. It combines fictional narrative with the author's memories of the Cossack occupation and settlement of the Friuli area.

== Background ==
Sibille-Sizia experienced life under Kosakenland as a late teenager and young woman in eastern Friuli. Later accounts of her life state that she observed and photographed the Cossacks, learned some of their language and attended events within the Cossack community. Her direct experience became an important source for the novel. She would begin writing the book in 1947.

== Plot ==
The novel begins with the arrival of Cossack formations and their families in Friuli in 1944. The Cossacks have been recruited by the German authorities to participate in operations against Italian partisans and have been promised territory in which they can establish a permanent settlement named "Kosakenland in Norditalien". The story is set largely around the Torre valley, where Sibille-Sizia lived. The arrival of the Cossacks transforms the lives of the local inhabitants. The novel follows both the occupying forces and the civilian population accompanying them, including women and children.

The Cossacks are portrayed not simply as a military force but as a displaced population caught between competing political and military interests. Their position becomes increasingly precarious as the German military situation deteriorates. With the end of the war, the settlement collapses and the Cossacks face the impossibility of establishing themselves in Friuli and the danger associated with returning to the Soviet Union.

== Reception ==
=== Early editions ===
The novel received recognition in connection with the Viareggio Prize in 1957. The biographical entry for Sibille-Sizia published by the Italian Presidency of the Council of Ministers records the work as receiving a mention in the prize that year. Kappa Vu, which published a later edition of the book, reproduces a statement by the poet Diego Valeri describing the work as an extraordinary achievement and praising Sibille-Sizia's handling of its large cast of events and characters and the way she wrote about her own experience. Pier Paolo Pasolini, in a statement in regards to the novel stated that Bruna was one of the "few valid voices from Friuli".

=== Subsequent editions ===
Historian and writer Tito Maniacco described it as a work to which readers should return and characterized the limited recognition it had received as an "opportunity missed" by Italian culture. An article in ''Friuli nel mondo'' published in 1992, in connection with the third edition, described the book as a narrative of the Cossack presence in Friuli between August 1944 and May 1945. The article also reported literary critic Lucio Tollis's view that the republication represented both a rediscovery and a reaffirmation of Sibille-Sizia's abilities as a writer.

A 2005 article in Cahiers d'études italiennes comparing Carlo Sgorlon's "Army Of The Lost Rivers" with other works on the period identifies Sibille-Sizia's novel as an earlier treatment of the same historical episode. The article observes that the boundary between historical documentation and literary fiction is relatively thin in La terra impossibile and describes its depiction of events and people as comparatively concrete.

== Legacy ==
A biographical study presented by the Regional Council of Friuli Venezia Giulia identifies Sibille-Sizia's novel and later journalism as part of the literary background to the later treatments of the Kosakenland episode by Claudio Magris (in Inferences from a Sabre) and Sgorlon (Army Of The Lost Rivers).

== Editions ==
- Bruna Sibille-Sizia (1956). La terra impossibile: storia dell'armata cosacca in Friuli. Udine: Doretti.
- 2nd ed., 1958;
- 3rd ed., 1991;
- 4th ed., Kappa Vu, 1992;
- 5th ed., Gaspari, 2023, ISBN 978-88-7541-801-4.

== See also ==
- World War II
- Italian Civil War
- Kosakenland
- Operation Ataman
- Battle of Ovaro
- Republic of Carnia
- Army Of The Lost Rivers
