= Vian Sora =

Iraqi-American painter (born 1976)

- Born: 1976 (age 49–50); Baghdad, Iraq
- Known for: Painter, author

Vian Sora (born 1976 in Baghdad, Iraq) is an Iraqi American artist.

== Biography ==
Sora was born in Baghdad in 1976. She left Iraq in 2006, during the Iraq War, eventually settling in Louisville, Kentucky with her husband in 2009.

Sora works primarily with oils, but utilizes mixed media and engraving techniques to create three-dimensional textures on canvas. The work is primarily expressionist and figurative, with contemporary abstract images used to convey moods and scenes from antiquity. Her works demonstrate the influences of the East and West on her painting and upon her existence. Women of all cultures, of ancient and modern times, are a central theme in her work. She represents women as silent spiritualists and shows their journey as a constant struggle for survival.

Sora has held exhibitions throughout Iraq, Turkey, the United Arab Emirates, parts of Europe and the Middle East. She received her degree from Al Mansour University College in Baghdad and Bellarmine University, United States.

She has published a Turkish language book concerning her works which is titled Neher, Seher, Misafirat (River, Voyage, Time). The title was also the name of her art exhibition that was held in Topkapi Palace, Istanbul, Turkey. Her most recent solo show took place at the US Chamber of commerce in support of WEAVE-Washington Empowered Against Violence, September 2011

== See also ==
- Iraqi art
- Islamic art
- List of Iraqi artists
- List of Iraqi women artists
