= Hanaa Malallah =

Iraqi artist and educator

- Born: 1958 (age 67–68); Theeqar, Iraq
- Education: Institute of Fine Arts, Baghdad; Academy of Fine Arts in Baghdad; University of Baghdad; University of London
- Known for: Painting, drawing, installation art, writer
- Website: Hanaa Malallah.com

Hanaa Malallah (born 1958) is an Iraqi artist and educator living in London, England. Her surname also appears in English as Mal-Allah. She is noted for developing the technique called the Ruins Technique in which found objects are incorporated into artwork.

== Life and career ==
Hanaa Malallah was born in Theeqar, Iraq in 1958. She moved to Baghdad with her family when she was aged five years. Growing up in Baghdad, she experienced the multiple conflicts and revolutions that ravaged her country. These experiences had a major influence on her work.

She received a Diploma in Graphic Art from the Institute of Fine Arts in Baghdad where she studied with Shakir Hassan Al Said, obtained a BA in painting from the Academy of Fine Arts in Baghdad (1988), an MA in painting (2000) and a PhD in the philosophy of painting from the University of Baghdad (2001) with her thesis entitled, Logic Order in Ancient Mesopotamian Painting. She also holds a post-graduate certificate in Islamic and Modern Art from School of Oriental and African Studies, London University. She has taught at the Institute of Fine Arts and the University of Fine Arts in Baghdad and holds a fellowship at the Chelsea College of Arts.

She is part of the so-called Eighties Generation as the group of Iraqi artists active during the 1980s are known. This group drew inspiration from the Archeological Museum, as Mallalah herself acknowledges in her essay, "Consciousness of Isolation," published in 2001.

As a female artist and professor of art, working in Iraq in the 70s and 80s, she received a number of threats against her life. For this reason, she felt that she had no choice but to leave Iraq and accept a new life outside her native land. In 2006, she left Iraq to take up a fellowship in Paris. She ultimately settled in London from 2007. However, she has said that she feels spiritually depleted living outside Iraq.

In 2012, she held a fellowship at the Chelsea College of Arts in London.

== Work ==
Much of her work deals with themes around the "chaos of war" which she had experienced in Iraq. In particular, her work explores the search for identity in the aftermath of war, the destruction of cultural materials and the isolation of artists.

Beginning in the 1970s, while still in Iraq, Malallah developed a technique which she called the ruins technique. Born out of the scarcity of art materials in war-ravaged Iraq, she turned to items that were readily available in her immediate surroundings, such as burnt paper, torn cloth, barbed wire, splintered wood and bullets. In an interview, the artist explains the philosophy behind the ruins technique:

This technique refers both to ancient and contemporary Iraq. On the one hand, it relates to the damage that objects undergo when they are destroyed – something that I am familiar with, having seen destruction of buildings, objects and relics up close. On the other hand, the Ruins Technique allows me a unique way to express my sensitive reading of shape and colour which I gained from my studies and writings on Ancient Mesopotamia... With this method I am not creating an image of ruins, but I am re-creating the process by which a material becomes a ruin.

Due to the disenfranchisement of Iraqi female artists after the 2003 invasion of Iraq, many Iraqi women were subjugated to traditional gender roles and barred from being in spaces that they had once been the majority of-including art. Nonetheless, Hanaa has refused to gender her art despite much of her artwork being influenced by the chaos of the invasion. In Nusair's article she mentions that Malallah "argues that art has no gender, and its concern is the work and its aesthetics." Her belief in art being genderless is shown in her artwork titled She/He Has No Picture which she installed in 2019 in remembrance of those who died in a bombing of a Baghdad neighborhood.

In an interview with Ruba Asfahani, Malallah speaks about her abstract art techniques, which is also her signature that includes the numbers "5.50.1.1.40.1.30.30.5" Each of these numbers correspond to the arabic alphabet. Malallah mentions that these numbers of importance to her due to her knowledge corresponding with how the Mesopotamians wrote with shapes instead of letters, and how art can be understood through a logical order. In the interview, Malallah explains: "This has caused me to become much more sensitive to every line and every drop of paint in my work."

The arabic cultural magazine Qafila has described one of the elements of Malallah's work that make her art stand out as Matter. The author, Fada Sabeety, describes three of Malallah's artwork that uses this element along with the methods and techniques Malallah uses to represent it. One of the methods that represent Matter is the use of raw materials on a canvas, which is essential to many of Malallah's work. Three of these works which Sabeety mentions are "Illuminated ruins", "Study of a skull", and "Camouflage." The raw material in question is a white cloth that is burned for a specified period of time in order to achieve the black, brown, and beige colors. Malallah is very precise with the end product of the cloth, as the raw cloth represents the essence of many of her works.

A curatorial note written by Saleem Al-Bahloly describes Hanaa's artwork as influenced by the catastrophic destruction of Iraq. Al-Bahloly mentions that Malallah created the art image Iraq, New Map/US Map from this influence of chaos where she created a cartography of Iraq with pieces of scorched paper When Malallah first moved to London, her first production The Name of the flower was reminiscent of the chaos of war and the influence of the history of Iraq. What makes this stand out is that it is a daftar or leaf artbook that Malallah has created to combine the chaos of Iraq along with its history.

Her work has been described as reminiscent of Nouveau réalisme.

Her work is represented in the British Museum's permanent collection and is also included in the collections of Jordan's Museum of Fine Arts in Amman, the Centre for Modern Art in Baghdad, the Arab Museum of Modern Art in Doha and the Barjeel Art Foundation in Sharja.

=== Exhibitions ===
- Strokes of Genius, Brunei Gallery, 2000
- “Expression of Hope, Aya Gallery, 2003
- Contemporary Iraqi Art, [Featuring Malallah and four other Iraqi artists], Pomegranate Gallery, May–June, 2008
- Ashes to Art: The Iraqi Phoenix, [Featuring Malallah and four other Iraqi artists living in exile], Curated by Peter Hastings Falk, Pomegranate Gallery, 2005
- Iraq's Past Speaks to the Present, British Museum
- Sophisticated Ways: Destruction of an Ancient City [joint exhibition with Rashad Salim], 6 June – 6 September, Aya Art Gallery, London
- Iraqi Artists in Exile, [With 14 other notable Iraqi artists including Shakir Hasan Al Said and Dia Azzawi], Curated by Alan Schnitger, Station Museum of Contemporary Art, Houston, 1 November 2008 – 1 February 2009
- Hanaa Malallah, From Figuration to Abstraction, The Park Gallery 2018

=== Select list of notable artworks ===
- Codes and Signs, mixed media on canvas, 77 × 77 cm, 1998
- Looting of a Baghdadi Manuscript, oil on wood, 8 × 97 cm, 2003
- Omen of the Burning City, [Book art], mixed media on paper and canvas, 50 x 50 cm, 2007
- Baghdad City Map, mixed media on paper and canvas, 180 x 180 cm, 2007
- My Country Map, 2008
- Abstract, Figurative, 2011
- Mesopotamian Rhythm, 2012
- My Night 16–17.01.1991, 2012–2013
- Arabesque III, 2013–2016
- Three Red Roses, 2016

=== Select list of publications ===
- Iraq: How, Where, for Whom? by Hanaa Malallah, A.M. Qattan Foundation, 2012

== Awards and recognition ==
Malallah received a prize awarded by the Arab League Educational, Cultural and Scientific Organization.

== See also ==
- Iraqi art
- Islamic art
- List of Iraqi artists
- List of Iraqi women artists

== Bibliography ==
- Shabout, N. (2014). "Ghosts of Futures Past: Iraqi Culture in a State of Suspension". In Robinson, Denise (ed.). Through the Roadblocks: Realities in Raw Motion, [Conference Reader]. School of Fine Arts, Cyprus University, 23–25 November.
- Ruba Asfahani, Interview With Hanaa Malallah: Iraq’s Pioneering Female Artist 28 November 2016
