= Najiba Ahmad =

Kurdish writer, poet, and translator

- نه‌جیبە ئه‌حمه‌د
- Born: 1954 (age 71–72); Kirkuk, Iraq
- Education: University of Sulaymaniyah
- Occupations: Poet, Writer, Translator
- Writing career
- Language: Kurdish
- Years active: 1970s – present
- Period: 20th century – present
- Genres: Poetry, Short Stories, Translation
- Subjects: Kurdish culture, Women's issues, Kurdish Liberation Movement
- Notable works: Spring Weeping (1994, Tabriz, Iran); Rasan (short stories, 1994, Tabriz, Iran); History of the Apple-tree (1998, Hawler, Iraqi Kurdistan); The Butterflies of Death (short stories, 1998, Hawler, Iraqi Kurdistan); A Deer Created of Water (2005, Hawler, Iraqi Kurdistan); Resurrection of Pear Buds (2005, Hawler, Iraqi Kurdistan)

Najiba Ahmad (born 1954) (Kurdish:نه‌جیبە ئه‌حمه‌د, Necîbe Ehmed; pronounced [nadʒiːba aħmad]) is a contemporary Kurdish writer, poet, and translator.

== Life and career ==
Ahmad was born in the northern city of Kirkuk in 1954. She studied Kurdish language and literature at the University of Sulaimaniya and worked as a teacher for many years before joining the Kurdish liberation movement. When she began writing poetry, she was the only female Kurdish literary figure.

Along with a handful of female Kurdish poets and writers, including Kajal Ahmad (b. 1967) and Mahabad Qadragi (b. 1966), she is regarded as making a significant contribution to the development of Kurdish literature.

== Work ==
She has published three volumes of her short stories and of her poetry and her work is also included in anthologies such as An Anthology of Modern Kurdish Literature She has also translated poetry from Arabic and Persian to Kurdish and written literary articles, novels, short stories, drama, and literary works for children.

== Selected publications ==
1. Spring Weeping, Tabriz, Iran, 1994.
2. Rasan (short stories) Tabriz, Iran, 1994.
3. History of the Apple-tree, Hawler, Iraqi Kurdistan, 1998.
4. The Butterflies of Death (short stories), Hawler, Iraqi Kurdistan 1998.
5. A Deer Created of Water, Hawler, Iraqi Kurdistan, 2005
6. Resurrection of Pear Buds, Hawler, Iraqi Kurdistan, 2005

== See also ==
- Iraqi art
- List of Iraqi artists
- List of Iraqi women artists
- List of Kurdish scholars
