= Firyal Al-Adhamy =

Bahrain-based British Iraqi artist (born 1950)

- فريال الأدهمي
- Born: 1950 (age 75–76); Baghdad, Iraq
- Education: University of Baghdad
- Known for: Painter
- Movement: Hurufiyya movement
- Spouse: Hakim AlAdhamy
- Website: Al-Adhamy Official Website

Firyal Al Adhamy Al-Adhamy (Arabic: فريال الأدهمي; born 1950 in Baghdad, Iraq) is a Bahrain-based British Iraqi artist.

== Life and career ==
Born in Baghdad in 1950, she began her artistic endeavours as a hobby, crafting jewellery, costumes, textiles and woodwork, all inspired by Iraq's ancient cultural history. Later, when some of her jewellery was acquired by museums, she began to see her work as a potential career.

Although she graduated from the University of Baghdad, she did not study arts and is a self-taught artist.

She aims to faithfully reproduce ancient objects, thereby preserving Iraq's heritage. Firyal's latest collection, Postcards from Mesopotamia, is inspired by her reaction to the tragic looting of the Museum of Baghdad in 2003.

She has participated in both solo and group exhibitions, in London and in the Persian Gulf.

== Work ==
She has written one novel, and has also published a book with a collection of her poetry and paintings. Much of her work is inspired by poetry. Her later paintings incorporates Arabic script, over which she has mastery demonstrates a sincerity to Arab civilization especially the Babylonian and Sumerian civilizations. Her artworks have inspired the poetry of several Arabic poets including Laoy Taha and Mahmoud Darwish.

=== Solo exhibitions ===
- 1988 – The Gallery, Intercontinental Hotel, Bahrain. Organized by the Ministry of Information
- 1990 – Kufa Gallery, London, UK organized by Ross Issa
- 1993- The Artist Studio, London, UK
- 1997- The Artist Studio, London, UK
- 2006- Darlelbareh Gallery, Manama, Bahrain
- 2008- Green Art Gallery Dubai "Postcards from Mesopotamia"
- 2009- The Memory of the place Gallery " When the Word Turns into Fragrant Ray of Light " Manama Bahrain

=== Joint exhibitions ===
- 1987 – Bahrain Art Society Annual Exhibition, Bahrain
- 1988 – Alfan Gallery, Bahrain
- 1988 – Bahrain Art Society Annual Exhibition, Bahrain
- 1989 – Print making annual Exhibition London UK
- 1991 – Iraqi Artist Society Exhibition at Gallery 4, London, UK
- 1991 – Iraqi Artists at Kufa Gallery, London, UK
- 1992 – Arab Women Artists by the General Union of Palestinian Women
- 1992 – Iraqi Artist Society at Camden Town Lock, London, UK
- 1992 – Iraqi Women's Festival of Culture, Kufa Gallery, London, UK
- 1993 – Iraqi Artists Society at Gallery 4, London, UK
- 1993 – Group of International Artists, London, UK. Organized by Eastern Art Report
- 1993 – Group Exhibition, Imperial College, London, UK
- 1994 – Group Exhibition, Aramco, Inmaa Gallery, Saudi Arabia
- 1995 – Arab Fine Art Exhibition, London, UK. Organized by Arab-British Chambers of Commerce
- 1995 – “The World’s Women On-line Electronic Ballet” - Internet exhibition at the UN conference, Beijing, China
- 1995 – Arab Women Artists in London, Saidy Gallery, London, UK
- 1996 – Women Artists of the Islamic World, Islington Museum Gallery, London, UK
- 1997 – Group Exhibition at Saudi Arabian Art Gallery
- 1998 – Working for hotels’ project in the Persian Gulf
- 1998 – Group Exhibition “Selection from Arab Contemporary Art”, Bahrain
- 2001 – “Dialogue of the present” Groups of 18 Arab women artists was toured exhibition from January 1999 to January 2001, covering Bath, Plymouth, London (SOAS, Brunei Gallery) and Brighton University, UK
- 2008-09 Iraq Speaks to the Present, British Museum, UK
- 2009 - "Babylon Myth and Reality" British Museum London 2008-2009

== See also ==
- Islamic art
- List of Iraqi artists
- List of Iraqi women artists
