= Coiling =

Method for storing rope or cable in compact yet easily attainable form

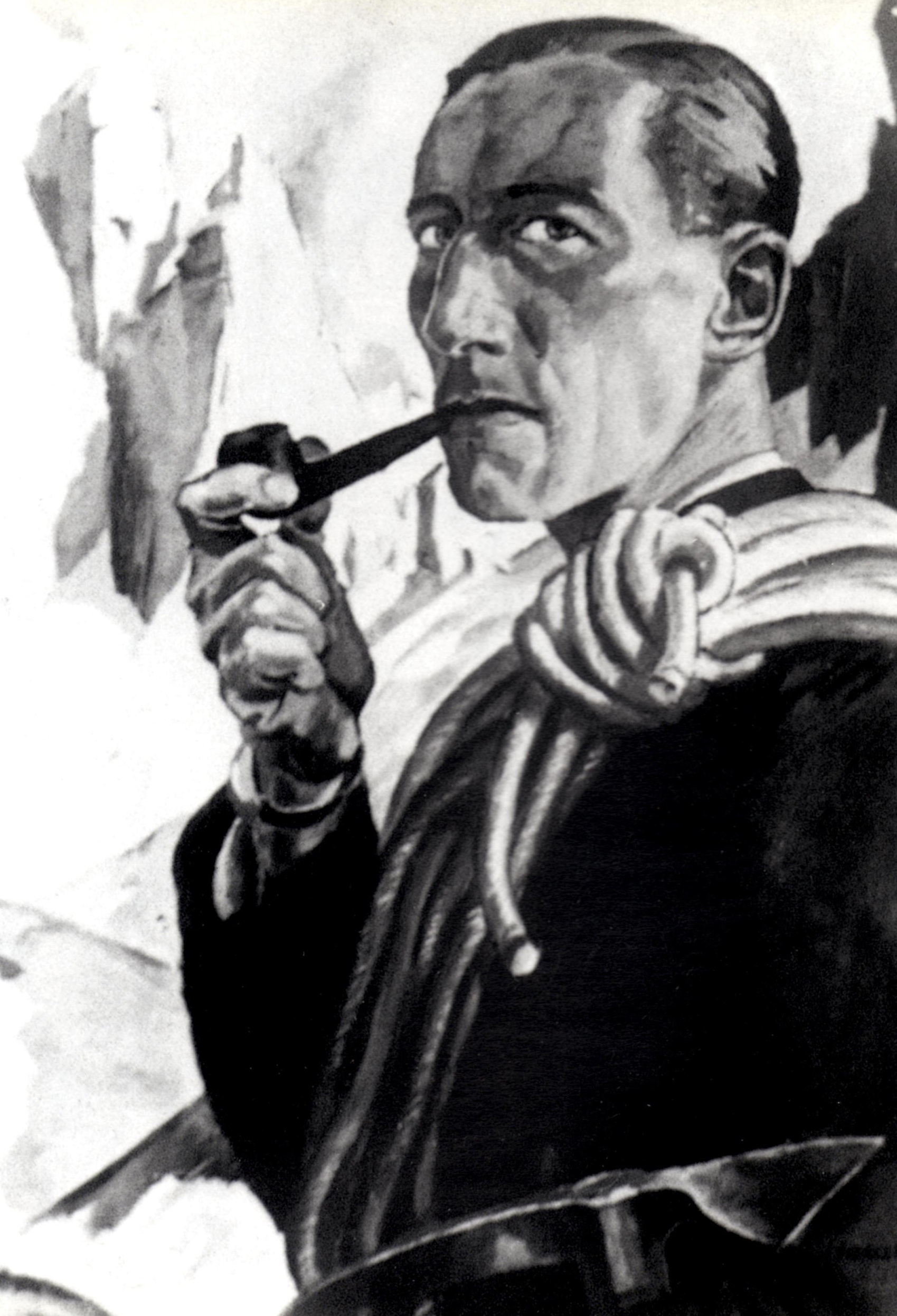
Self-portrait of Erwin Merlet with a mountaineer's coil slung over his shoulder and the Sella Towers in the background.

A coiling or coil is a curve, helix, or spiral used for storing rope or cable in compact and reliable yet easily attainable form. They are often discussed with knots.

Rope are often coiled and hung up in lofts for storage. They are also hung over stakes in farm wagons and on hooks in moving vans, fire apparatus and linesmen's repair trucks. For such active storage coils must be well made.

— The Ashley Book of Knots

== Mountaineer's coil ==
The mountaineer's coil (also alpine coil, climber's coil, lap coil, or standing coil) is a traditional method used by climbers to store and transport a climbing rope. This older style coil is noted as being more prone to twists and tangles than the butterfly coil, and care must be taken upon uncoiling to avoid these problems.

=== Tying method ===
Begin by taking hold of the rope in one hand with its end facing you. Coil the rope in arm's length sections with your free hand (extending it away from the other as far as it will reach to ensure each segment is of equal length as it is gathered). Alternate tucking the new gather in front and behind the previous coil to avoid putting a half-turn in the rope with each coil.

When the last segment is reached form a short bight atop the gathered rope with its standing end. Grasp the working end and pass it over the bight and back through the center of the coiled rope in a round turn several times, making each new wrap closer to the bight until only a short tail remains. Pass this tail through the bight then grasp the standing end and pull it away from the bight until it is cinched tight around the working end.

For added security, ensure both ends are sufficiently long to tie them into a reef knot.

Forming the coil

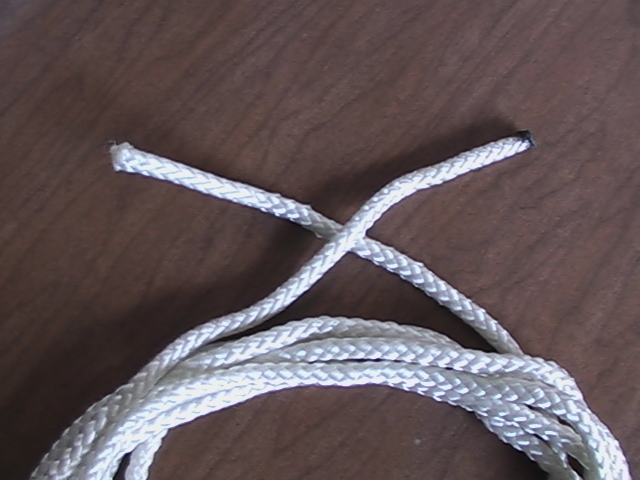
Coil the rope until its ends are reached

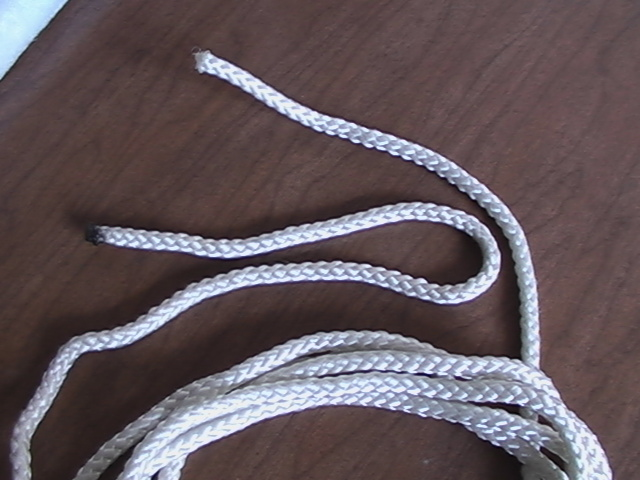
Make a bight in one end (the standing end)

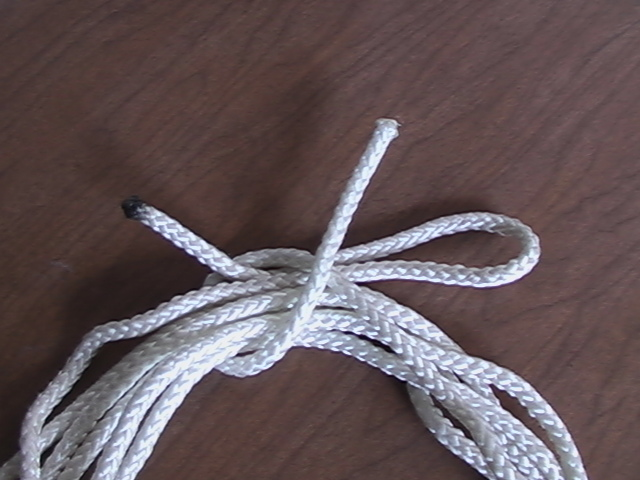
Wrap the opposite end (the working end) around the coil in a round turn

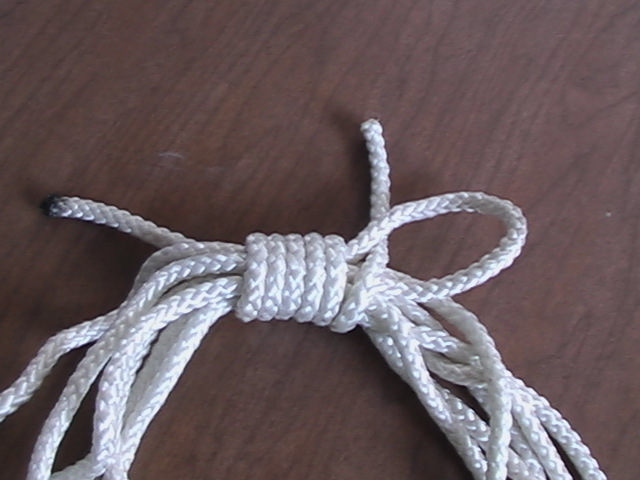
Make several additional round turns then insert the working end through the bight

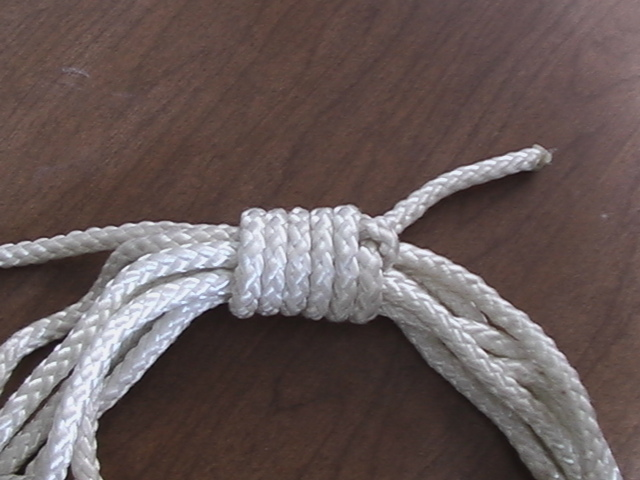
Pull the standing end to tighten the bight and complete the knot

== Butterfly coil ==
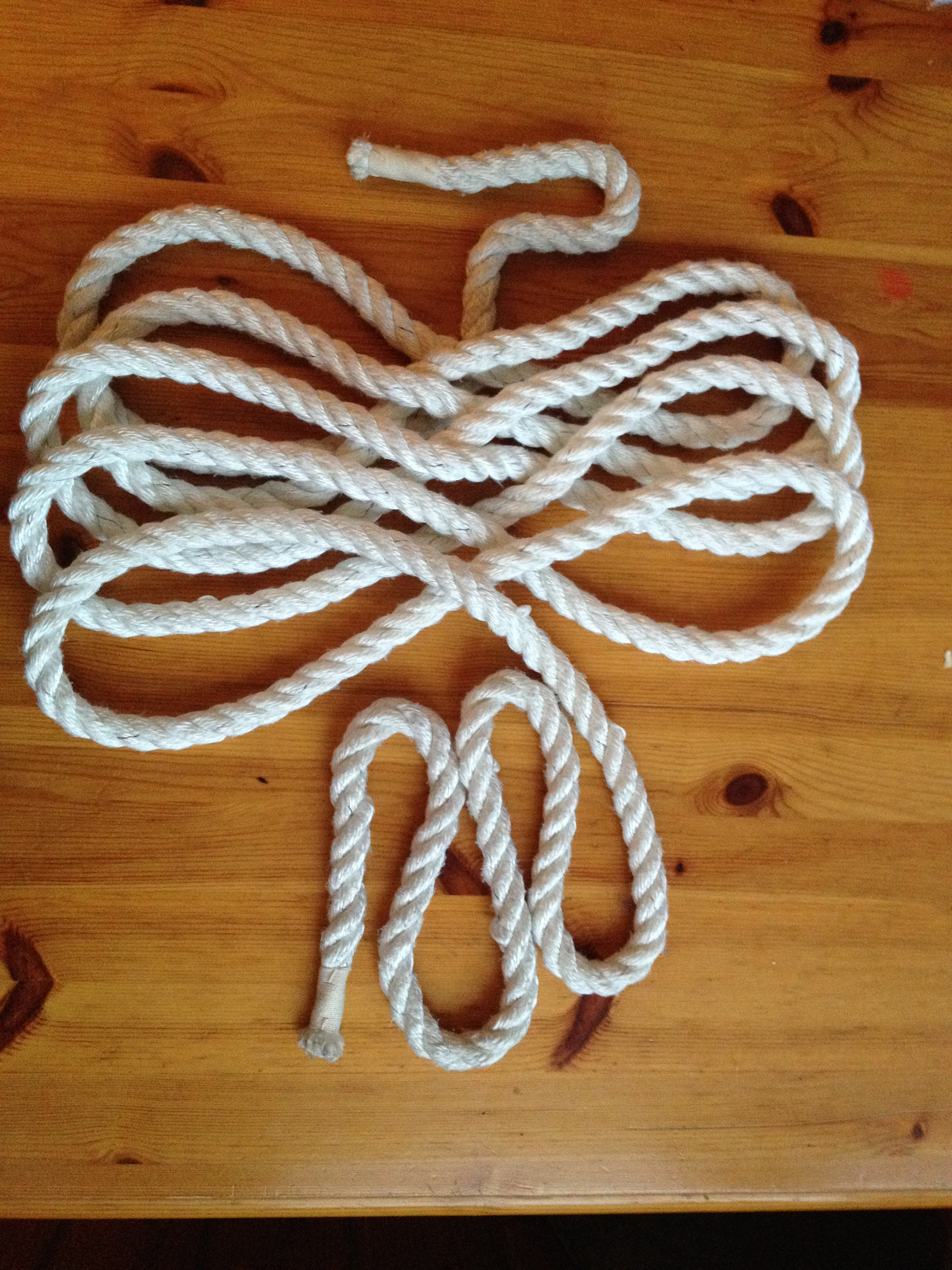
Tying the Butterfly coil, 1-folding or faking-down

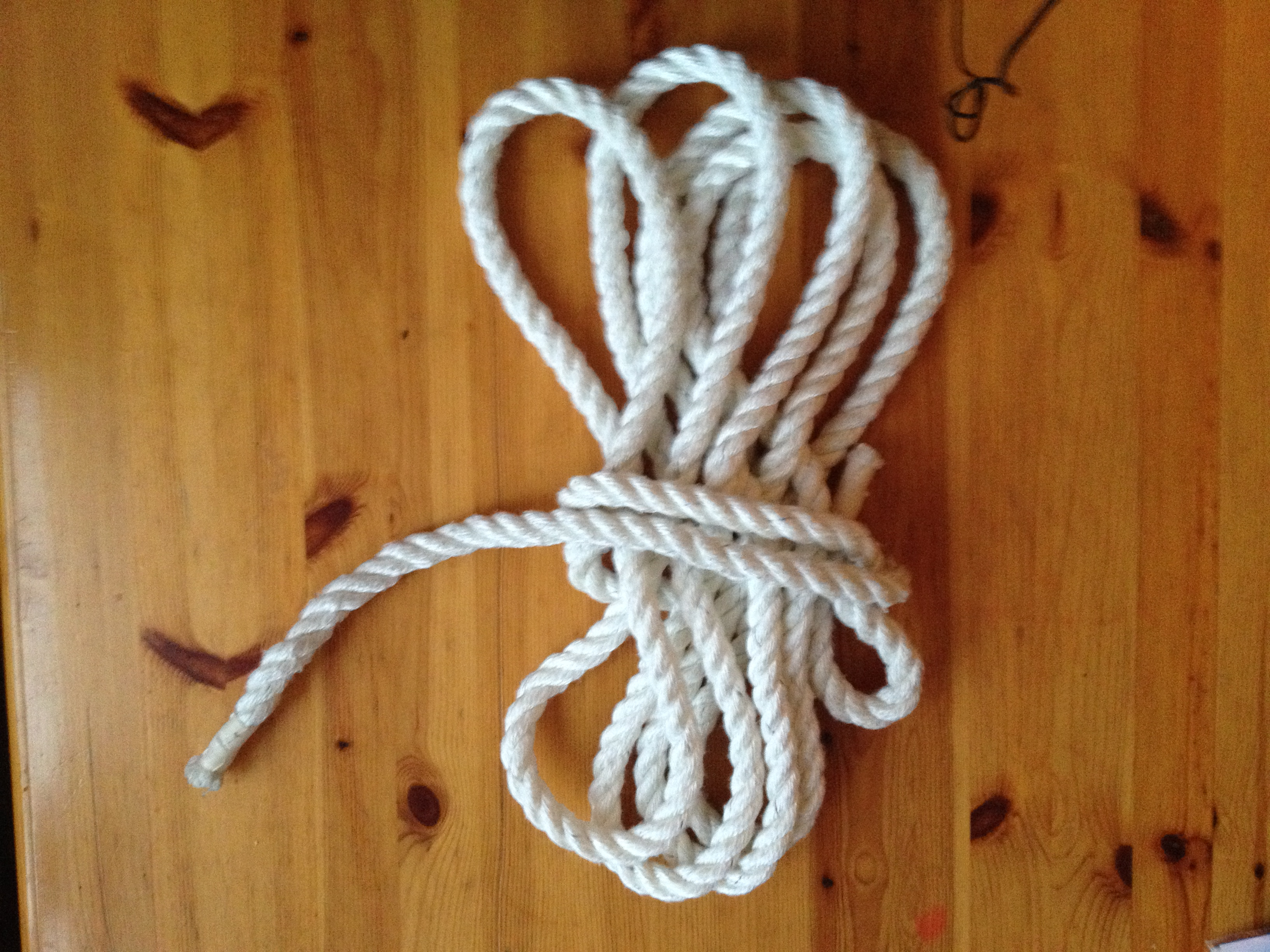
Tying the Butterfly coil, 2-wrapping

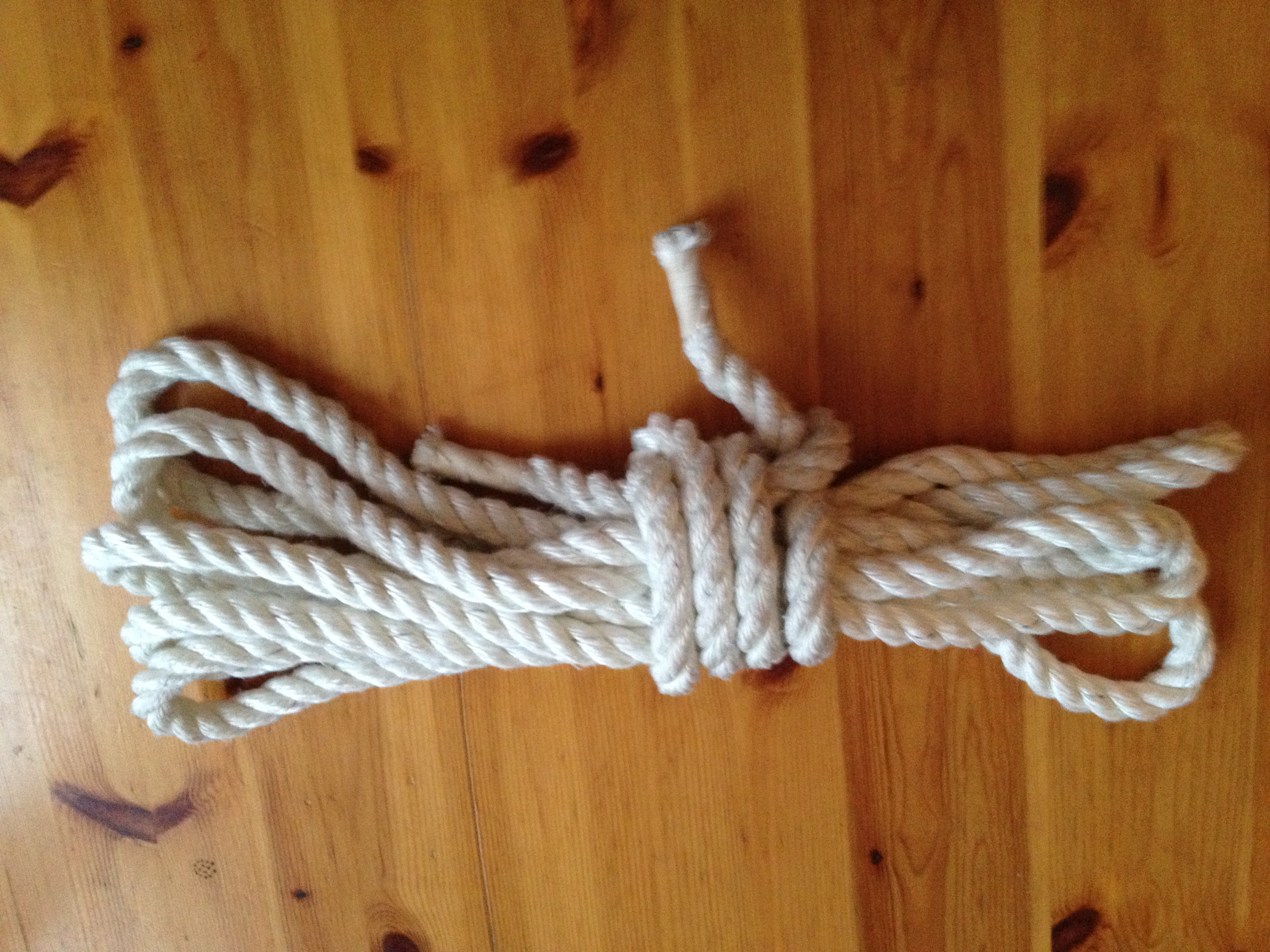
Tying the Butterfly coil, 3-finished

The butterfly coil (also known as a backpacker's coil) is a method used by climbers for storing and transporting a climbing rope. Slinging the coiled rope over the shoulders and tying it in place for carrying earns the technique its alternative name.

Unlike the alpine coil it cannot be attached to a harness for climbing, and thus is useful only for transporting a rope to and from where it must be used.

The method is also useful for much smaller items such as for keeping earphone cables from tangling.

=== Tying method ===
Depending on the thickness and length, one can use palms of hands stretched out to the sides (crossing over the neck), two knees, passive side palm and elbow, or two fingers of the passive hand. The following is for the extra long climbing rope.

Start with both rope ends in one hand. Pull 1.5–2 arm lengths of the pair through and let their ends hang free. Begin coiling the balance of both strands one arm length at a time, alternating the gathers in the opposite hand into two separate "lobes" (or wings) draping on either side.

With 1.5–2 arm lengths remaining secure the coil by wrapping both strands twice round both lobes approximately 1–1.5' down, then pass a short bight above the wraps and through the coil. Pass both free ends over the top of the coil and through the bight to cinch it tight.

Attach the rope for transport by placing the coil atop one's back, with one free end passing over each shoulder. Pass the ends back under the armpits, cross them over the coil, then bring them forward again, securing in front with a square knot.

An alternate method draws the doubled rope over the shoulders instead of in front of the climber.

== Over/under cable coiling ==
Over/under cable coiling refers to a method of storing cables that preserves the capacitance and common-mode rejection ratio built in by the manufacturer with a twist in the cable, and the shielding that encases the twisted pairs within. It allows the cable to lie flat when uncoiled, and makes for easier and faster work.

The "over/under" name refers to the practice of twisting the cable in one direction to make the first coil, and un-twisting it to make the next, and repeating this until all the cable is neatly coiled. Care needs to be taken to keep each end on its proper side of the roll when uncoiling otherwise a knot will appear with every other loop. Connecting the ends on the outside of the loops, or tying them in that position, ensures that the ends don't pass through the loops in storage so there are no knots when the cable is laid out.

There are a number of informal terms in common circulation including "over/under wrapping", "countercoiling", and "flip-coiling".

=== Straight coiling ===
Straight coiling, or the practice of coiling a cable in the same direction coil after coil, has the similar result to coiling cable on a spool. If the cable comes off the spool the same way it goes on, the internal 'lay' is preserved, and the cable isn't damaged or twisted internally. If a cable is straight coiled and then pulled from the coil, it has the effect as coiling cable on a spool and then pulling the cable off the top of the spool, imparting a twist in the cable with every coil that is removed. To make it lie flat, the twist will need to be removed. The advantages of straight coiling cable are that it will not produce knots when uncoiling and is easily taught and therefore can be accomplished easily by assistants.

== See also ==
- Sheepshank, also known as shank knot – Type of knot
- Chain sinnet – Series of knots for shortening a cable
