= List of Iraqi women artists =

This is a list of women artists who were born in Iraq or whose artworks are closely associated with that country.

== A ==
- Najiba Ahmad (born 1954), poet
- Kajal Ahmad (born 1967 Kirkuk), Kurdish-Iraqi poet
- Firyal Al-Adhamy (born 1950), painter
- Reem Alasadi (active since 2000), fashion designer
- Rheim Alkadhi (born 1973), interdisciplinary artist
- Jananne Al-Ani (born 1966), artist, photographer, filmmaker, researcher
- Layla Al-Attar (fl. 1965–1993), painter
- Sama Alshaibi (born 1973), contemporary artist
- Halla Ayla (born 1957), photographer, painter

== C ==
- Wasma'a Khalid Chorbachi (born 1944), Iraqi-American ceramist, calligrapher, painter

== E ==
- Enheduanna, poet 23rd century BC, thought to be the earliest poet

== F ==
- Lisa Fattah (1941–1992), German-Iraqi painter, married to influential sculptor, Ismail Fatah Al Turk

== H ==
- Zaha Hadid (1950–2016), Iraqi-British architect

== K ==
- Hayv Kahraman (born 1981), painter and sculptor
- Toba Khedoori (born 1964), Iraqi-Australian mixed-media artist (twin sister of Rachel Khedoori)
- Rachel Khedoori (born 1964), Iraqi-Australian artist (twin sister of Toba Khedoori)

== M ==
- Hanaa Malallah (born 1958), Iraqi mixed-media artist

== O ==
- Madiha Omar (1908–2005), pioneer of Hurufiyya movement

== R ==
- Nuha al-Radi (born 1941), diarist, ceramist, painter

== S ==
- Hana Sadiq (active since 1980s), fashion designer
- Salima Salih (born 1942), short story writer, translator and artist
- Naziha Salim (1927–2008), painter, sculptor
- Tamara Salman (active since 2004), fashion designer
- Lorna Selim (1928–2012), British-Iraqi painter, wife of Jawad Saleem influential Iraqi sculptor
- Vian Sora (born 1976), Iraqi-American painter

== T ==
- Aatqall Taúaa (active since 1970s), digital artist

== Z ==
- Zeena Zaki (born 1974), fashion designer
- Haifa Zangana (born 1950), writer, artist, political activist

== See also ==
- Iraqi art
- List of Iraqi artists
