= Kajal Ahmad =

Kurdish poet, writer and journalist

- کەژاڵ ئەحمەد
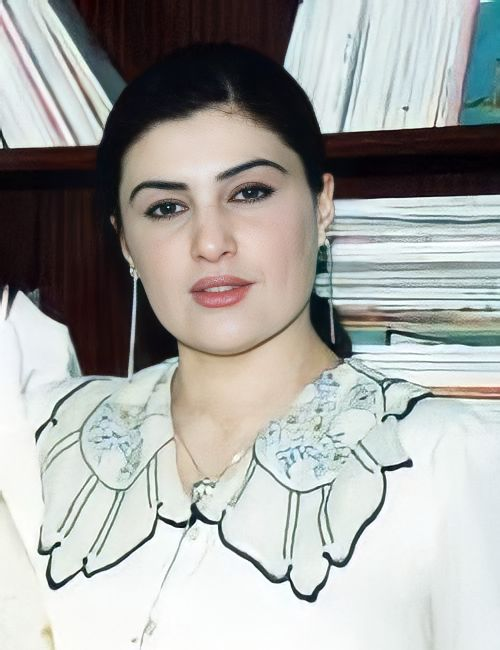
- Kajal Ahmad, Kurdish poet
- Born: Kajal Ahmad; 1967 (age 58–59); Kirkuk, Iraq
- Occupations: Poet; Journalist; Writer
- Years active: 1986–present
- Organization: Patriotic Union of Kurdistan
- Known for: Poetry and journalism
- Notable work: Handful of Salt (2016)
- Television: Dijebaw on Kurdsat
- Website: Kajal Ahmad Poetry Translation Centre

Kajal Ahmad (born 1967) is a contemporary Kurdish poet and journalist, known for the show Dijebaw on Kurdsat. She started writing poetry in 1987.

== About ==
Ahmad was born in Kirkuk in 1967 of Kurdish ancestry. She began writing poetry in 1986, and publishing it at the age of 21. Her poems, are known for being "fierce" and "sensual", and have gained a reputation for "brave, poignant and challenging work throughout the Kurdish-speaking world." They have been translated into Arabic, Persian, Turkish, Norwegian and English. The English-language Handful of Salt, a translated collection, was released in 2016 by Word Works.

Kajal's lifestyle has been criticised by conservatives. She refuses to wear the veil and writes about a conservative culture that restricts women's life choices and the contradictions inherent in her homeland's cultural norms. Although men are attracted to her, they do not offer commitment, and women avoid her so that she feels isolated and lonely.

In addition to writing poetry, she is a journalist and writes social commentary and analysis, particularly on women's issues and politics. Ahmad was editor-in-chief of Knwe, the daily newspaper of the Patriotic Union of Kurdistan, for more than ten years. She has also presented programs on Kurdsat. Her writings demonstrate her commitment to preserving Kurdish culture, the liberation of Kurdistan and to gender equality.

Along with a handful of female Kurdish poets and writers, including Najiba Ahmad (b. 1954), she is regarded as contributing to the development of Kurdish literature.

She lives and works in Sulaimaniya, Iraq.

== Works ==
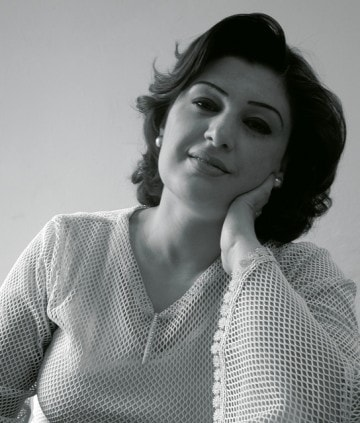
a photo of Kajal Ahmad, taken with the camera of a Spanish photographer in 2005.

Her poetry is embedded in Kurdish traditions, and her subject matter deals with themes of exile, isolation, homeland and conflicting emotions. She has published seven books of poetry, and her work is also included in anthologies of important Iraqi poets.

- Benderî Bermoda, 1999
- Wutekanî Wutin, 1999
- Qaweyek le gel ev da, 2001
- Awênem şikand, 2004
- Diwanî Kajal Ahmad, 2006
- Min Dibêt Xom Bismîl Bikem, 2014 ‌ ‌
- Zmanî balndem dezanî, 2019
- Erobringer, 2005, booklet, translated to Norwegian by Hawdem Salih jaf, Inger Østenstad. Publisher: Cappelen, Oslo
- Kajal Ahmad Poems, translated to English by Mimi Khalvati and Choman Hardi (Enitharmon Press/Poetry Translation Centre, 2008)
- Qasaed tumtr narjsan, 2008, Kajal Ahmad poems translated from Kurdish to Arabic, published by Dar Almada/Damascus
- Handful of Salt, translated ito English by Alana Marie Levinson-LaBrosse, Mewan Nahro Said, Darya Abdul-Karim Ali Najm and Barbara Goldberg (The Word Works, 2016)

== See also ==
- Iraqi art
- List of Iraqi artists
- List of Iraqi women artists
- List of Kurdish scholars
