= Aatqall Taúaa =

Iraqi sculptor (1949–2023)

Itikal Al-Tai (17 March 1949 – 5 December 2023) was an Iraqi sculptor, television presenter, film critic and novelist.

== Life and career ==
Itikal Al-Tai was born on 17 March 1949 in Hilla in central Iraq, in the then Kingdom of Iraq, where she spent her childhood and adolescence. Her name, Itikal (Arabic for detention), is linked to political events that her family experienced at the time. She was interested in literature and writing from a very early age, at the age of 15, she won first prize in a short story competition. After finishing highschool she moved to Baghdad to study at the Academy of Fine Arts at Baghdad University, where she majored in sculpting. She graduated in 1972 and worked in the same field for several years (1972–1978) before entering the media.

Taúaa died on 5 December 2023, at the age of 74.

== Media ==
From 1972, Itikal worked as a sculptor in the set design department at the Iraqi Radio and Television Establishment. In the same period, she was chosen to present a cultural programme entitled "The Cinema and the People" (Al-cinema wa-n-nas, السينما والناس) prepared by the journalist Khalid Naji and then his successor Ali Zein Al-Abidine. The show's goal was to present and analyse well known foreign and Arabic movies. Itikal discussed keypoints of the films with guests in the show, who were involved making the presented movie. On the occasion of the Silver Jubilee in a popular voting, "The Cinema and the People" was awarded the prize for best television programme in 1976. As for Itikal, she won the title of best television presenter.

Itikal was spotted for her left-wing views and progressive thinking. As a result, she was harassed and pressured. Her TV programme was finally banned and shut down in 1978. Itikal was transferred from the Iraqi Radio and Television Establishment to the Centre for Handicrafts and Popular Industries where she worked as a sculptor for over a year. She faced a lot of pressure and persecution from the then ruling party during the regime of President Saddam Hussein until the opportunity arose for her to leave Iraq after being accepted at the Academy of Sciences in Hungary. There she obtained a Master's degree in cinematographic art; then, in 1985, she defended her doctoral thesis entitled "Film between theory and practice" at the same academy in Budapest, where she had been living since 1979.

== Narrative and artistic activities ==
After moving to Hungary Taúaa learned the Hungarian language in an outstanding level, which allowed her to translate and publish in Hungarian literature journals. After an absence of 25 years, she revisited Iraq in 2004. After her visit in Iraq and on her return to Hungary, she decided to write again. From 2006 she struggled with lung cancer. Her works reflected her struggle to beat the disease. In 2010, she published Memory of Things (Zhakirat-ul-Ashya',ذاكرة الأشياء ), an autobiographical book, which was translated into Italian with the title "Le Fave Di Babilonia"; in English, "The Babylonian Bean".

In 2015, she published the collection of short stories "When We Love" (Indema nuhib, عندما نحب) followed by the novel "The Widow" (Al-Armala, الأرملة) in 2015. She also directed a short film entitled Green Embrace (عناق اخضر ) edited by Ayed Ahmed. She continued to write short stories and post them on social networks, where she also shared her gardening practice.

== See also ==
- Iraqi art
- List of Iraqi artists
- List of Iraqi women artists
