= Tamara Salman =

Iraqi designer

- Born: Baghdad, Iraq
- Education: Winchester School of Art
- Occupations: Fashion designer, businesswoman
- Years active: 1990s–present
- Known for: Founder of Tamara Salman accessories brand

Tamara Salman (born in Baghdad, Iraq) half-Iraqi, half-British is a British designer and business woman. Her accessories company launched in 2013.

She was appointed Creative director for Liberty of London in 2004 where she remained for six years, her role was to update the brand's image and revive its signature prints and produce an own brand accessories and home collection.

She has worked in the fashion industry since graduating from art school, working for some of Europe's most prestigious fashion houses, including Romeo Gigli and Prada.

In 2012 she started researching and developing her own accessories business which was officially launched in August 2013 under the brand name Tamara Salman Limited. Her design work is influenced by her mixed heritage, East meets West and the love of colour and pattern.

Living primarily in England form a young age she attended The Gregg School in Hampshire and went on to study Textiles at Winchester School of Art.

She studied textiles at Winchester School of Art, before working for Prada and Romeo Gigli.

She made an appearance on Mary Queen of Shops.

== See also ==
- Iraqi art
- List of Iraqi artists
- List of Iraqi women artists
