= Chain sinnet =

Series of knots for shortening a cable

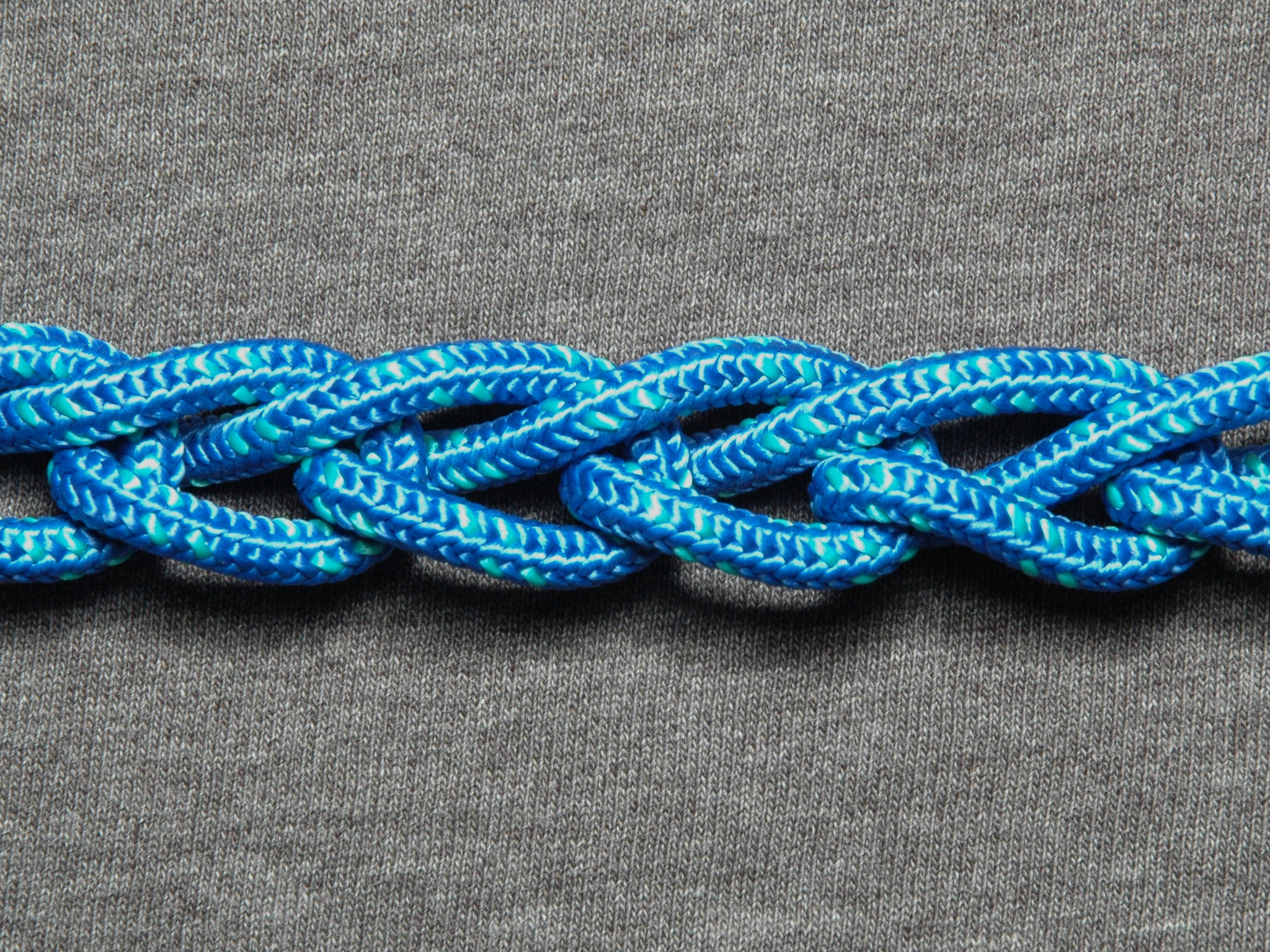
- Names: Chain sinnet, chain sennit, chain shortening, chain stitch, chain braid, caterpillar sinnet, crochet stitch, daisy chain, monkey braid, single trumpet cord, single bugle cord
- Releasing: Non-jamming
- Typical use: Shortening rope or cable for use or stowing
- ABoK: #1144, #1145, #2868
- Instructions

A chain sinnet (or chain sennit) is a method of shortening a rope or other cable while in use or for storage. It is formed by making a series of simple crochet-like stitches in the line. It can also reduce tangling while a rope is being washed in a washing machine.

== Tying ==
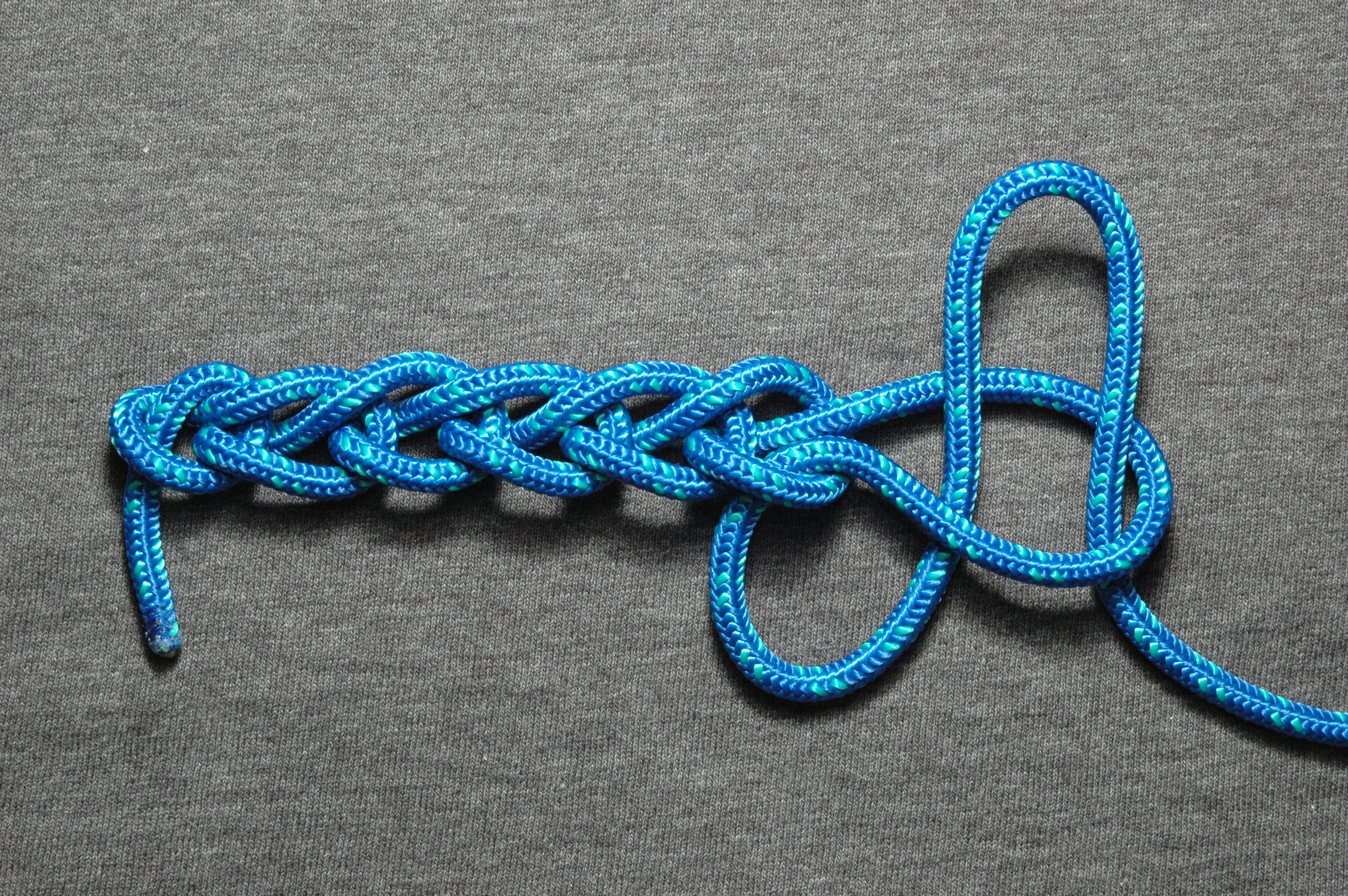
Tying steps two and three in progress

To tie:

1. Create a loop in the rope. Then pull a bight of the working part through the loop, creating an overhand noose knot.
2. Pull another bight of the working part through the loop of the previous stitch.
3. Tighten the stitch to the desired degree by pulling on both sides of the loop. Adjust the loop by pulling on the working end to keep it a reasonable size.
4. Repeat steps 2–3 until the rope has been sufficiently shortened.
5. To lock the sinnet, pass the working end through the final loop.

To restore the rope to its original length, pull the end passed in the last step back through the final loop and pull on the free end. The sinnet will quickly unravel.

As an alternative for long ropes the rope can be doubled one or more times before chaining. All one needs to do is keep hold of one end and feed throughout of the pile of rope to the other end, then start from the two conjoined ends, or then keep hold of the two ends, and feed back to the middle and then start chaining. This can be done in confined spaces or dangling in mid-air if need be, and is a common way to manage caving ropes without introducing troublesome twist.

== See also ==
- List of knots
- Chain stitch
- Coil knot
- Daisy chain
- Sennit
- Sling (climbing equipment)
