= Wasma'a Khalid Chorbachi =

- Born: 1944 (age 81–82); Cairo
- Education: Harvard University
- Known for: ceramic art

Wasma'a Khalid Chorbachi is an American-Iraqi artist.

== Personal background ==
Born in 1944, in Cairo to Iraqi parents, Khalid is a Ceramicist, calligrapher, and painter who lives and works in the United States. She is recognized as a "prominent Arab American female artist" and a "specialist in Islamic art"

== Selected exhibitions ==
Solo exhibitions have been held in Beirut, 1966, 68, and 70; Florence, 1967; Abu Dhabi, 1976; Jedda, 1981; Cambridge, Massachusetts, 1983; London, 1984 and 85; Al-Khubar, Saudi Arabia, 1990; Sackler Museum, 2001. She participated in the group exhibition Forces of change presented in 1994 at the National Museum of Women in the Arts, Washington, where her work was described as "abstract expressionist".

== Educational pursuits ==
Her doctoral thesis in the history of Islamic art from Harvard University, Beyond the symmetries of Islamic geometric patterns : the science of practical geometry and the process of Islamic design, made a "pioneering use of tessellation theory for the analysis of angular interlacing patterns". She directed and designed the book Issam El-Said: Artist and Scholar published in 1989 by the Issam El-Said Foundation. She taught and published on Islamic geometry. She is an instructor at the Ceramics Program of the Office for the Arts at Harvard University.

Museums Her ceramic pieces have been acquired by notable museums around the world such as: The British Museum; The Royal Scottish Museum in Edinburgh; The Boston Museum of Fine Arts, where a 2019 gallery re-install includes a video interview with the artist alongside one of her pieces; Harvard Art Museums /Fogg Museum, Busch-Reisinger, Arther M. Sackler Museum; Beit Al Qur'an, Bahrain, among others.

== See also ==
- Arabesque
- Iraqi art
- Islamic art
- Islamic calligraphy
- List of Iraqi artists
- List of Iraqi women artists
