= Hayv Kahraman =

Iraqi-American artist of Kurdish descent (born 1981)

- Born: Hayv Kahraman; 1981 (age 44–45); Baghdad, Iraq
- Education: Umeå University
- Known for: Painting, Drawing, Sculpture
- Website: hayvkahraman.com

Hayv Kahraman (born 1981) is an Iraqi-American-Swedish artist of Kurdish descent, who was born in Baghdad and fled to Sweden with her family during the Gulf War, studied in Florence, and is currently based in Los Angeles. She is primarily a painter.

== Life and career ==
Born in Baghdad, Iraq in 1981 to Kurdish parents, a Kurdish mother from Slemani. Her family fled to Sweden in the aftermath of the Persian Gulf War (1990–1991). During the Iran–Iraq War, Hayv spent a lot of her time in the basement of her uncle's house. Her relatives would all huddle around candles and play card games. While living in Iraq, she attended the Music and Ballet School in central Baghdad. One night, her family packed their car and hired a smuggler to take them to Sweden, and this is when she became a refugee. She enrolled in music and ballet classes, but decided to leave due to the teacher's racism. She studied at the Academy of Art and Design in Florence, Italy. She lives and works in California, United States. Her life is impacted by these global events and greatly informs her artwork. Due to her origin and gender she has been well suited around the world on exhibitions in women in the Arab world or "contemporary approaches to Islamic artistic traditions"

== Works ==
Themes

The theme of violence in her work maybe due to her experiences with war and being a refugee. Most importantly, the idea of fractured identities is evident in her work because of war and population displacement. She focuses on border and boundaries persistently being broken down. She believes you develop who you are based on your location. Therefore when there are boundaries and borders that are broken, your identity becomes broken as well. Her works have a global perspective. For example, "Marionettes" addresses the submissive role of women doing chores such as cleaning. Her works additionally covers themes of gender and body politics, migration, and the diaspora. In her 2024 exhibition Look Me in the Eyes at the Institute of Contemporary Art San Francisco, she explored questions of surveillance, nationalism, classification, and mobility through the motif of eyes across a series of paintings and sculptures.

Techniques

She is also recognized for the techniques she uses in her work including science and geometry specifically the use of pattern. For example, she uses decorative textile patterns. She also has used science (3D scanning and processing) to take images of her body to deconstruct and reconstruct it. The goal was to be able to view her body from different perspectives. Other techniques she uses includes Chinese ink painting, Japanese woodblocks and Russian nestling dolls.

Examples of her pieces:

War-aq, the Arabic word for playing cards, is a very personal group of her works. She combined the idea of a scattered deck of cards with the experiences of five million displaced Iraqis. Migrant 11 is a series of a contorted dancer that refers to the deformation of the self due to migration. This work relates to her personal experience of attending the music and ballet school in central Baghdad. Migrant 3 is a self portrait of herself cutting off her tongue to represent the loss of language and communication through her life experiences. Re-Weaving Migrant Inscriptions (2017) is a series of paintings that recalls the traditional Iraqi woven fan, or mahaffa, by cutting and weaving sections of her oil-painted self portraits, constructing a narrative of forced exile, displacement and cultural assimilation.

Not Quite Human (2019) was exhibited at the Jack Shainman Gallery in Chelsea. Several oil on linen paintings. Female figures are depicted bending their bodies into a collection of extreme positions. Kahraman’s paintings transmit strength, distress, submission and erotism all at the same time.

Body Screen is an installation work from 3D scans of Kahraman's body. A laser scanner went a long the outside of her nude body creating more than 80 scans. The body was sectioned and placed into two rooms using a lattice screen. As an observer you only have access to the other room by looking through this screen. There is a shanshool or mashrabiyya from the Arab region. The lattice screen is ecofriendly, and creates a means to "observe" from the privacy of one's own home. This places women in a position of power where they can see without being seen especially when it comes to men/the male gaze. This work is very direct, it breaks the mastering gaze and challenges the passive, domesticated and traditional place of women.

== Exhibitions (selection) ==
=== Selected solo exhibitions ===
- Gut Feelings, The Mosaic Rooms, London (2022)
- Touch of Otherness, SCAD Museum of Art, Savannah (2022)
- Not Quite Human: Second Iteration, Pilar Corrias, London (2020)
- To the Land of the Waqwaq, Shangri La Museum of Islamic Art, Culture, and Design, Honolulu, Hawaii (2019)
- Displaced Choreographies, De La Warr Pavilion, Sussex, UK (2019)
- Project Series 52, Pomona College Museum of Art, Claremont, California (2018)
- Hayv Kahraman: Acts of Reparation, Contemporary Art Museum St. Louis, St. Louis, Missouri (2017)
- Ghost Fires, Jack Shainman Gallery, New York, New York (2025)

=== Selected group exhibitions ===
- Reflections: Contemporary Art of the Middle East and North Africa, British Museum, London (2021)
- Blurred Bodies, San Jose Museum of Art, San Jose, California (2021)
- New Time: Art and Feminisms in the 21st Century, Berkeley Art Museum, Berkeley, California (2021)
- In Plain Sight, Henry Art Gallery, Seattle, Washington (2019)
- When Home Won’t Let You Stay: Migration through Contemporary Art, Institute of Contemporary Arts/Boston (2019)
- Suffering From Realness, Massachusetts Museum of Contemporary Arts (MASS MoCA), North Adams (2019)

== Collections ==
Kahraman’s work is in several important international collections including:

- Birmingham Museum of Art, Birmingham, Alabama
- British Museum, London, UK
- Museum of Contemporary Art, San Diego, California
- Los Angeles County Museum of Art (LACMA), California
- MATHAF: Arab Museum of Modern Art, Doha, Qatar
- North Carolina Museum of Art, Raleigh, North Carolina
- Pérez Art Museum Miami, Miami, Florida
- Pizzuti Collection of Columbus Museum of Art, Ohio
- The Barjeel Art Foundation Sharjah, UAE
- The Rubell Museum (formerly The Rubell Family Collection), Miami, Florida

== See also ==
- Iraqi art
- List of Iraqi artists
- List of Iraqi women artists
