= Halla Ayla =

Iraqi American photographer

- Born: Halla Ayla; 1957 (age 68–69); Baghdad, Iraq
- Known for: Painting, Photography
- Website: hallaaylaart.com

Halla Ayla (born in 1957) is an Iraqi American artist and self-taught photographer, currently living in San Francisco, CA. She is noted for her activism and is a champion of women's rights and also works to encourage peace and understanding between the Arab world and the West. These causes are reflected in her artwork.

== Early life and career ==
Ayla was born Baghdad, Iraq, and grew up in Baghdad and in Beirut, Lebanon. Ayla divided her time between Iraq, Lebanon and Saudi Arabia, after which she lived in Europe for 15 years before travelling to the United States in 1991 and finally settling in San Francisco.

She achieved BA in Business from Sorbonne University in Paris, as well as MA (Marketing & Business) from the American College in London and Webster University, Geneva. She also undertook art courses at the College of Marin in California.

With more than 30 years of experience as a photographer, she began painting in her early thirties and now combines photography with painting and collage to create mixed-media painted photographs from her journeys to the Middle East. She makes extensive use of transfers, which she uses to build up multi-layered images with texture and of complexity.

She is an activist; a champion of women's rights and also works to encourage peace and understanding between the Arab world and the West. These causes are reflected in her artwork and her public appearances. She gave a keynote address at a Red Cross Annual Meeting where she spoke about the historic legacy of the Arabs and its impact on today's world. Ayla has also appeared on national and local radio and television such as ABC's "Good Morning America" as a champion for Arab art culture and humanity.

== Work ==
A distinctive feature of Ayla's artwork is the use of Arab motifs such as calligraphy and the geometric patterns of Arabesque. Much of her work is produced in series, with each series dedicated to a specific geographic region. Her first series was entitled The Arab World Unveiled; the second was The Mysteries of Egypt, and the third, which focused on the Levant (Lebanon, Syria, and Jordan), was called Everyday Enchantment. A later series was called the Magic of Morocco.

== See also ==
- Hurufiyya movement
- Iraqi art
- Islamic art
- List of Iraqi artists
- List of Iraqi women artists
