= Fadhil Al Azzawi =

Iraqi poet and novelist

Fadhil Al-Azzawi
- فاضل العزاوي
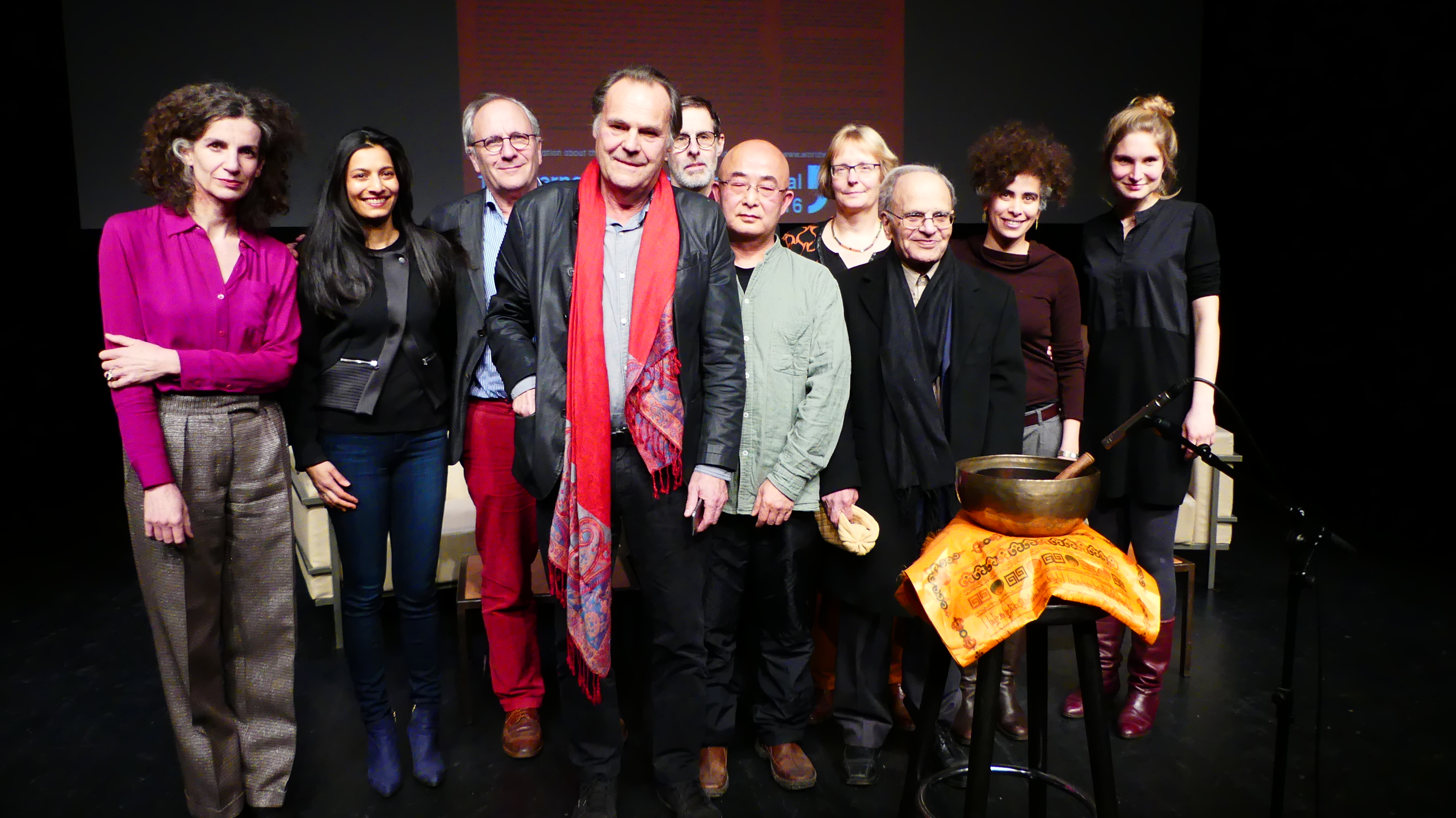
- Fadhil Al Azzawi (third from right) at the Worldwide Reading for Ashraf Fayadh on January 14, 2016 at Hebbel am Ufer in Berlin.
- Born: 1940 (age 85–86); Kirkuk, Kingdom of Iraq (present-day Iraq)
- Education: BA (English Literature), Baghdad University, PhD (Leipzig University)
- Occupations: poet, writer, translator and journalist

Fadhil Al Azzawi (Arabic: فاضل العزاوي; born 1940) is a prominent Iraqi poet and writer. He has published ten volumes of poetry, six novels, three books of criticism and memoir, and several translations of German literary works. He participated in Iraq's avant-garde Sixties Generation, and his early controversial work was lauded with great enthusiasm.

== Life and career ==
Fadhil Al Azzawi was born in Kirkuk in 1940. As a young boy, he was fascinated by the sound and rhythm of the Qu'ran and noticed that poetry was evident in Iraqi folklore such as the tales of the Arabian Nights. In the post war period, when contemporary poetry filtered into Iraq, Al Azzaawi quickly acquainted himself with its forms.

He holds a BA in English Literature from Baghdad University.

He edited a number of magazines in Iraq, and founded the poetry magazine Shi’r 69, which was subsequently banned. He spent three years in jail under the dictatorship of the Ba`th regime.

As the Baathist-controlled regime became increasingly powerful, Fadhil decided to leave Iraq in 1976 for political reasons. He later earned a doctorate in communications studies from Leipzig University. He has worked as a freelance journalist and translator for Arab newspapers and cultural reviews.

He currently resides in Berlin, where he works as a full-time writer.

== Works ==
He has published nine volumes of poetry in Arabic and one in German. He also contributes articles and poetry to magazines, newspapers and journals and regularly writes for Words Without Borders. His works have been translated into European and Eastern languages, including English, German, French, Swedish, Spanish, Norwegian, Hungarian, Turkish, Hebrew, and Persian. His poetry is also included in anthologies such as Fifteen Iraqi Poets.

- Miracle Maker, Selected Poems. BOA Editions. 2004. ISBN 978-1-929918-45-4.
- In Every Well a Joseph Is Weeping, Quarterly Review of Books, 1997
- "Cell Block Five" (2008, The American University in Cairo Press)
- The Last of the Angels (2007, The American University in Cairo Press).
- The Traveler and the Innkeeper (2011, The American University in Cairo Press).
- Contributor to A New Divan: A Lyrical Dialogue Between East and West (Gingko Library, 2019). ISBN 9781909942288

== See also ==
- Iraqi art
- List of Iraqi artists
