= Nuha al-Radi =

- Born: نهى الراضي; January 27, 1941; Baghdad, Iraq
- Died: August 30, 2004 (aged 63); Beirut, Lebanon
- Known for: Painting, Ceramics, Sculpture, Writing
- Notable work: Baghdad Diaries

Nuha al-Radi (Arabic:نهى الراضي; January 27, 1941 – August 30, 2004) was an Iraqi diarist, ceramicist and painter and noted author of the Baghdad Diaries which vividly recounts the horror of living through the first Gulf War.

== Life and career ==
She was born into a distinguished Iraqi family which included Mahmud Shevket Pasha, Prime Minister of the Ottoman Empire. In 1919, her father Mohammed Selim al-Radi was one of the first Iraqis to be educated in the United States when he studied agriculture in Texas. He married Suad Abbas, became an Iraqi diplomat and was appointed ambassador to Iran in 1947 and then to India from 1949 to 1958, where Nuha al-Radi grew up. She was educated at private English-speaking schools in Delhi and Simla, except for a brief spell in 1956 when she attended a boarding school in Alexandria to improve her Arabic, but this was interrupted by the Suez Crisis.

After the Iraqi Revolution broke out in 1958 and the monarchy was overthrown, Nuha al-Radi became a ceramist, having joined the Byam Shaw School of Art in London and later worked with Chelsea Pottery. She returned to Baghdad and exhibited in Iraq, Britain and Europe. In 1969, her family moved to Beirut and where she graduated in liberal arts from the American University in Beirut She also taught there and continued to work and exhibit as a ceramist, but the outbreak of the Lebanese civil war forced her to return to Baghdad.

In 1991, after the first three days of bombing in Operation Desert Storm, she began writing a diary in English. This was first published as "Baghdad Diary” and then translated into Dutch. She continued updating it until 1996. In 1998 her eyewitness account of the Gulf War and its aftermath was published as "Baghdad Diaries" and translated into several languages. The 2003 edition of the book includes a postscript with remarks on the American invasion of Iraq.

She died in 2004 from leukemia. She and her family believed that the leukemia may have been caused by the depleted uranium allies had fired at the tanks during the Gulf war.

== Work ==
Her works have been exhibited throughout the Arab world. Her ceramic works are often inspired by Iraqi folklore.

She has been praised for offering a uniquely female perspective on the male-centred business of war, occupation and economic sanctions in both her writing and her artwork.

=== Publications ===
Her book, Baghdad Diaries recounts the horrific experiences of living through the first Gulf war.

Select list of publications

- Baghdad Diaries: A Woman's Chronicles of War and Peace, Vintage Books, (1998) 2003

== See also ==
- Iraqi art
- Islamic art
- List of Iraqi artists
- List of Iraqi women artists
