= Sella Towers =

Mountain in Italy

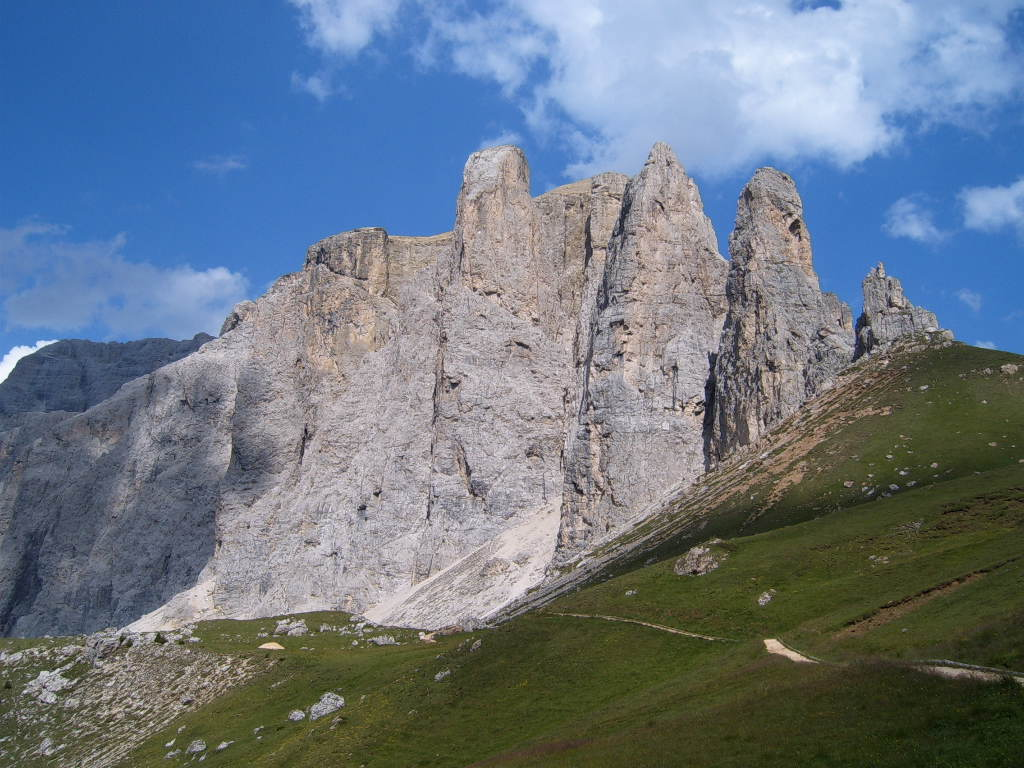

Highest point
- Elevation: 2,696 m (8,845 ft)
- Coordinates: 46°30′37″N 11°46′48″E

Geography
- Location: South Tyrol, Italy
- Parent range: Sella group

The Sella Towers (German: Sellatürme; Italian: Torri del Sella) are four summits in the Sella group in South Tyrol, Italy.
