= Army Of The Lost Rivers =

- Cover of the award-winning 1985 edition
- Editor: Mondadori
- Author: Carlo Sgorlon
- Original title: L'armata dei fiumi perduti
- Publication date: 1985
- Publication place: Italy
- Award: Strega Prize of 1985

Army of The Lost Rivers is a historical fiction book written by Carlo Sgorlon in 1985. The story explores the aftermath of Operation Ataman, the establishment of Kosakenland and the reaction of the local population of Carnia. The book was awarded the prestigious Strega Prize of 1985.

== Plot ==
The novel is set in a small village in Carnia during the final stages of the World War II. Marta lives in the house of Esther, together with the elderly woman and the sister of Marta's fiancé Arturo, who is missing in action in the Eastern Front, Soviet Theatre. The announcement of the Armistice of Cassibile initially raises hopes that the war is finally coming to an end, but German troops soon arrive and occupy the area. Esther and a group of Romani travellers are taken away, leaving Marta in charge of the house.

The villa subsequently becomes a refuge for people displaced by the conflict. Among them are Haha, an elderly Romani man who has survived the fate that befell his family, and Ivos, a battle-hardened soldier determined to prevent further suffering, even if this means returning to the fight. The house also receives a group of Cossacks who have travelled from Russia and settled in northern Italy after being promised a homeland, Kosakenland in Norditalien, in Carnia, by the Germans. Among the newcomers are Urvàn, Gavrila, Ghirei, Dunaika and the young Luca. Although the Cossacks are initially viewed with suspicion elsewhere, Marta offers them shelter, allowing them to experience a brief period of relative normality. Marta and Urvàn gradually develop a close relationship, but Urvàn remains deeply troubled by the uncertain future awaiting the Cossacks.

As food becomes scarce and the political and military situation deteriorates, relations between the Cossacks, the local population and the partisans become increasingly strained. The occupation gives way to violence and reprisals, and the Cossacks' position becomes untenable as the war turns against Nazi Germany and the wider Axis Powers. During their retreat towards Austria, Urvàn is killed near the Plöcken Pass, while many of the Cossacks gathered along the Drava River choose suicide rather than surrender to the advancing Soviet forces. Ghirei escapes and eventually returns to Marta's villa.

== Reception ==
A review by Antonio De Lorenzi published in November 1985, in the monthly newspaper "Friuli nel Mondo" presented the novel as a significant development in Carlo Sgorlon's increasingly historical fiction. It described the work as a “tragic and coral poem”, emphasizing the parallel between the collective tragedy of the Cossacks and the individual experiences of characters such as Marta and Urvan. According to the review, Sgorlon combined historical events with the "fairy tale" quality characteristic of his earlier writing, while introducing elements relatively unusual in his work, including military conflict, violence and descriptions of battle. The review interpreted the Cossacks' presence in Friuli principally through the theme of displacement and the loss of a homeland. Their settlement in the Kosakenland is portrayed as only a temporary refuge in a much longer history of exile. Particular emphasis was placed on the contrast between the different groups within the Cossack forces, from former members of the Russian aristocracy to irregular and more violent soldiers, as well as on their customs, songs, dances and Orthodox religious practices. Marta was identified by the reviewer as the moral centre of the novel. Her ability to see individual soldiers as human beings caught up in the war, regardless of which side they belonged to, was interpreted as an expression of pietas toward former enemies. Urvan, meanwhile, was presented as a figure increasingly conscious of the precariousness of the Cossacks' political project and of the failure of the leaders who had promised them a permanent homeland. The review regarded the destruction of the Cossack community at the end of the novel as the culmination of a broader tragedy of a people without a homeland. The survival and reconstruction of the Friulian community after the war was contrasted with the disappearance of the Cossacks from the historical scene.

In Stefano Magni's 2005 critical analysis of Carlo Sgorlon's novel, the author examines how Sgorlon subverts traditional conventions of historical fiction. Magni highlights a high degree of historiographical infidelity: key historical facts, such as the democratic structure of the Republic of Carnia and the documented atrocities and destruction committed by Cossack forces, are either omitted or downplayed in favor of an idyllic portrayal of the occupiers. Magni argues that Sgorlon privileges human empathy and personal myth over factual accuracy.

== Editions ==
- Carlo Sgorlon (1985). L'armata dei fiumi perduti (Collana Scrittori italiani e stranieri ed.). Milano: Arnoldo Mondadori Editore. p. 310. - Introduzione di Leone Piccioni, Collana Oscar n.1949, Mondadori, 1987; Collana Oscar Bestsellers n.674, Mondadori, 1996; Collana Oscar Moderni, Mondadori, 2020, ISBN 978-88-04-72065-2.
- Carlo Sgorlon (2006). L'armata dei fiumi perduti (Collez.Premio Strega. I 100 Capolavori. ed.). Torino: UTET. p. 364. - prefazione di Marco Antonio Bazzocchi, ISBN 978-88-02-07453-5.

== See also ==
- World War II
- Italian Civil War
- Kosakenland
- Operation Ataman
- Battle of Ovaro
- Republic of Carnia
- La Terra Impossibile
