= Jananne Al-Ani =

Irish-Iraqi artist (born 1966)

- Born: 1966 (age 59–60); Kirkuk, Iraqi Republic
- Education: Byam Shaw School of Art; Royal College of Art
- Known for: Photographer, film-maker
- Website: Official Website

Jananne Al-Ani (born 1966) is an Irish-Iraqi artist.

== Personal life ==
Al-Ani was born in Kirkuk, Iraq in 1966 to an Iraqi father and Irish mother. She studied Fine Art at the Byam Shaw School of Art and graduated with an MA in Photography from the Royal College of Art in 1997. She is currently Senior Research Fellow at the University of the Arts London, and lives and works in London.

== Career ==
Working with photography, film and video, Al-Ani has an ongoing interest in the documentary tradition, through intimate recollections and more official accounts. Her work also engages with the landscape of the Middle East, its archaeology and its visual representation.

Summarising her work in an interview with curator and critic Nat Muller, Al-Ani said: "I have a longstanding interest in the representation of the body. The earliest works I exhibited were concerned with the way women's bodies have been represented throughout the history of western painting. In advance of the development of photography and film, the shifting ideals of feminine beauty were clearly mapped out in the work of artists. However, the media coverage of the 1991 Gulf War, which focused on aerial and satellite images of a depopulated, barren landscape, had a major impact on my work. What followed was a reassessment on my part of the work of Orientalist painters and the way in which fantasies about the body and the landscape of the Middle East were constructed in their works. I began to see the body itself as a contested territory and during the 90s produced a series of works that attempted to counter the European obsession with uncovering and exposing the bodies of veiled women. More recently, with the Aesthetics of Disappearance project, I've attempted to re-occupy that space so, while the presence of the body is implied rather than explicit, the traces of human activity in the landscape are clear to see."

== Awards ==
- 1996: John Kobal Photographic Portrait Award.
- 2000: East International Award.
- 2011: Abraaj Capital Art Prize.

== Exhibitions ==
=== Selected solo exhibitions ===
- A Loving Man, Imperial War Museum, London (1999).
- Art Now: Jananne Al-Ani: The Visit, Tate Britain, London (2005).
- Darat al-Funun – The Khalid Shoman Foundation, Amman, Jordan (2010).
- Shadow Sites: Recent Work by Jananne Al-Ani, Freer Gallery of Art and Arthur M. Sackler Gallery, Washington, D.C. (2012).
- Groundwork, Beirut Art Center, Lebanon (2013).
- Excavations, Hayward Gallery Project Space, London (2014).

=== Selected group exhibitions and screenings ===
- Without Boundary: Seventeen Ways of Looking, Museum of Modern Art, New York (2006)
- The Screen-Eye or the New Image: 100 Videos to Rethink the World, Casino Luxembourg (2007)
- Closer, Beirut Art Center (2009)
- Women War Artists, Imperial War Museum, London (2011)
- The Future of a Promise, Magazzini del Sale, 54th Venice Biennale (2011)
- Topographies de la Guerre, Le Bal, Paris (2011)
- Arab Express: the Latest Art from the Arab World, Mori Art Museum, Tokyo (2012)
- all our relations, the 18th Biennale of Sydney (2012)
- Before the Deluge, CaixaForum, Barcelona and Madrid (2012-2013)
- Re:emerge, Towards a New Cultural Cartography, Sharjah Biennial 11 (2013)
- Mom, Am I Barbarian?, 13th Istanbul Biennial (2013)
- She Who Tells a Story, Museum of Fine Arts, Boston (2013)
- Assembly: A survey of recent artists’ film and video in Britain 2008–2013, Tate Britain, London (2014)
- Memory Material: Jananne Al-Ani & Stéphanie Saadé, Akinci Gallery Amsterdam (2014)
- Concrete, Monash University Museum of Art, Melbourne (2014)
- My Sister Who Travels, Mosaic Rooms, London (2014)
- Rituals of Signs and Transitions (1975–1995), Darat al-Funun – The Khalid Shoman Foundation, Amman, Jordan (2015–16)
- Traces of War, Inigo Rooms, London (2016)

=== Exhibitions co-curated by Al-Ani ===
- Fair Play (co-curated with Frances Kearney), Danielle Arnaud gallery, touring to Angel Row Gallery, Nottingham (2001–02)
- Veil, The New Art Gallery Walsall, touring to Bluecoat Arts Centre and Open Eye Gallery in Liverpool, Modern Art Oxford and Kulturhuset Stockholm (2003–04)

== Collections ==
Jananne Al-Ani's work is held in the following collections:

- Tate, London.
- Victoria and Albert Museum, London.
- Arts Council Collection.
- Pompidou Centre, Paris.
- Smithsonian Institution, Washington, D.C.
- Museum Moderner Kunst (mumok), Vienna.
- Darat al-Funun – The Khalid Shoman Foundation, Amman, Jordan.

== See also ==
- Culture of Iraq
- Islamic art
- List of Iraqi artists
- List of Iraqi women artists
