= Zain Kenderian =

Iraqi-American physician (born 1982)

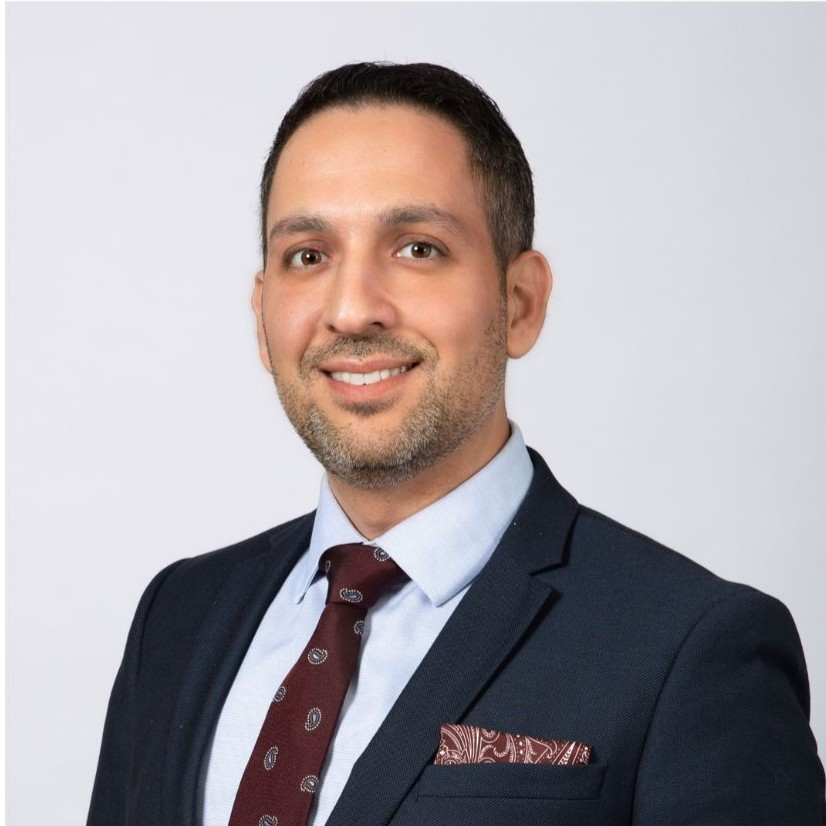
- Born: 1982 (age 43–44)
- Occupations: Physician, executive
- Known for: CEO of Bascom Palmer Eye Institute, Abu Dhabi
- Website: https://zainkenderian.com/

Zain Kenderian (born 1982) is an Iraqi-American physician and healthcare strategist, currently serving as the chief executive officer of the Bascom Palmer Eye Institute in Abu Dhabi, the first international location of the top-ranked American eye hospital for the 24th year.

He is recognized for his role in expanding advanced ophthalmic care in the Middle East and for promoting healthcare education and humanitarian initiatives.

== Early life and education ==
Kenderian was born in 1982. He earned a Doctor of Medicine (MD) degree and later completed a Master of Business Administration (MBA) at Northwestern University's Kellogg School of Management, focusing on healthcare management and global leadership.

== Career ==
Prior to his work in ophthalmology, Kenderian was involved in educational and medical projects in the UAE. He led initiatives on teacher training, healthcare consulting, and established multidisciplinary healthcare and educational centers. In 2019, he became the youngest president of the Minnesota Academy of Medicine.

Kenderian negotiated the partnership to open Bascom Palmer Eye Institute's first international facility in Abu Dhabi, which launched in November 2025. The institute provides advanced ophthalmic diagnostic, laser, and surgical services to the UAE population and supports clinical education and research.

Under Kenderian's leadership, the institute signed a strategic partnership with the Emirates Society of Ophthalmology to enhance medical training, scientific research, and public awareness initiatives in eye health.

In 2020, Zain Kenderian was appointed a Member of the Most Venerable Order of St. John of Jerusalem (The Order of St. John) by sanction of Her Majesty Queen Elizabeth II, in recognition of his services to healthcare and humanitarian initiatives.

Kenderian has authored opinion pieces addressing public health and the economic impact of vision impairment in the Gulf Cooperation Council countries. He has discussed regional healthcare infrastructure and eye care policies.
