= Philosophical Writings =

- Discipline: Philosophy
- Language: English
- Edited by: Claire Graham

Publication details
- History: 1996–present
- Publisher: Durham University (United Kingdom)
- Frequency: Triannually

Standard abbreviations
- ISO 4: Philos. Writ.

Indexing
- ISSN: 1361-9365
- LCCN: sn97032436
- OCLC no.: 37799316

Links
- Journal homepage

Philosophical Writings is a postgraduate academic journal of philosophy published by the philosophy department of Durham University. It publishes articles by advanced postgraduates and new academics. The journal is published in printed form only and is indexed in The Philosopher's Index.
