= List of Iraqi poets =

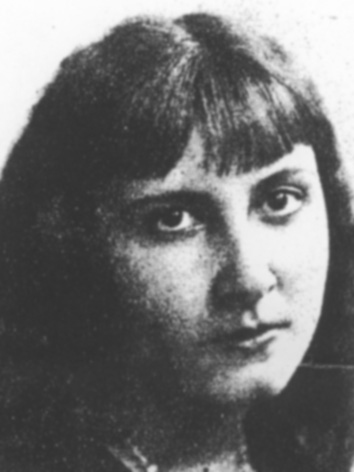
Dentist and poet Rabab Al-Kadhimi

Partial list of Iraqi poets.

- Abdul Hadi al-Shirazi
- Ahmed Matar
- Ali Bader
- Alise Alousi
- Amira Nur al-Din
- Atika Wahbi al-Khazraji
- Bahira Abdulatif
- Daisy Al-Amir
- Fatina al-Na'ib
- Fuzuli (poet)
- Hidir Lutfi
- Hijri Dede
- Jamil Sidqi al-Zahawi
- Lamia Abbas Amara
- Maruf al Rusafi
- Muhammad Sadiq Hassan
- Muhammad Sa'id al-Habboubi
- Muhammad Sa'id al-Sakkar
- Muhannad Al-Shawi
- Mulla Effendi
- Najiba Ahmad
- Nalî
- Nasrallah al-Haeri
- Nazik Al-Malaika
- Qusay al-Shaykh Askar
- Rabab Al-Kadhimi
- Riza Talabani
- Wafaa Abed Al Razzaq
- Waheed Khayoun
- Zaki al-Sarraf
- Zuhur Dixon
