= American Bar =

American Bar may refer to:

- an American-style bar, a retail business that serves alcoholic beverages
  - the American Bar at the Savoy Hotel, London, England
  - the American Bar at The Stafford, London, England
  - the American Bar at Hotel Torni, Kamppi, Helsinki, Finland
  - the American Bar at Buck's Club, London, England
  - American Bar (Vienna), Austria
- a body of attorneys in the United States
  - American Bar Association
- Américan-bar, a 1935 film with Milly Mathis
- The American Bar, a 2007 short story collection by Ward Badr Al Salim

== See also ==
- American Bar Foundation, a nonprofit research institute
