= Munira Al-Kazi =

- Born: 1939; Pune, India
- Died: March 20, 2023 (aged 83–84); Kuwait
- Education: Central School of Art and Design
- Relatives: Ebrahim Alkazi (Brother); Faiza Alkazi (Sister); Lulwa Alkazi (Sister)
- Notable work: The Icon (c. 1960); Conception (1962); Mother (1963); Untitled (Family) (1965)
- Style: Abstract art, Geometric art, Landscape painting
- Movement: Indo-Arab Art

Munira Al-Kazi (1939–2023) was a Saudi-Kuwaiti printmaker, drawer, and painter. Her work has been included in the collections of international art museums, including Museum of Modern Art (MOMA), Victoria and Albert Museum, Sharjah Art Museum, and The Sultan Gallery.

== Biography ==
Born in Puna, India, Al-Kazi was one of six siblings. As a result of the Partition of India, Al-Kazi, at age 8, and her family moved to Karachi, Pakistan.

Al-Kazi's brother, Ebrahim Alkazi, was an acclaimed theatre and film director. Faiza Alkazi was a jewellery designer and Lulwa Alkazi was an embroidery artist.

As a young adult, Al-Kazi and her family moved to London. She completed her education at London Central School of Art and Design. She would continue to live in London after graduating.

Al-Kazi briefly moved to Ibiza in the early 1970s. By the mid-1970s, she moved to Beirut, living with her mother and near other family. She was in Beirut during the Lebanese Civil War and would stay there permanently.

== Career ==
Al-Kazi began printmaking while at the Central School of Art and Design. Her prints were abstract, with "intricate mark-making endures, manifesting in squiggly lines, dots, blurs, and hatchings." She often used geometric motifs.

In 1969, Al-Kazi and Issam Al-Said held the inaugural exhibition at The Sultan Gallery, with her becoming the first female artist to have an exhibition in a Kuwaiti gallery.

In the 1970s, after moving to Ibiza, Al-Kazi began painting landscapes and pigeon motifs. Al-Kazi also had exhibitions at the Art Heritage Gallery in New Delhi, co-founded by her brother Ebrahim Alkazi, and his wife Roshan Alkazi.

After moving to Beirut, according to Kuwaiti artist Aseel AlYaqoub, Al-Kazi's art style developed "eclectic mix of influences, including her fascination with Sufi dervishes" and used a "delicate interplay of semi-impressionistic nuances and subtle surrealism." Al-Kazi began including digital elements into her works in the early 2000s.

Al-Kazi's mezzotint dry-point ink print Mother is kept in the collection at the Victoria and Albert Museum and her oil painting Conception is at MOMA.

== Selected exhibitions and projects ==
- 2025: Crafting Serpents in History, Nita Mukesh Ambani Cultural Centre
- 2023: Beirut and the Golden Sixties: A Manifesto of Fragility, Mathaf: Arab Museum of Modern Art
- 2022: Khaleej Modern: Pioneers and Collectives in the Arabian Peninsula, NYU Abu Dhabi Art Gallery
- 2022: Memory sews together events that hadn't previously met, Sharjah Art Museum
- 2018: A Century in Flux: Highlights from the Barjeel Art Foundation, Sharjah Art Museum
- 2017: Arab Print: Volume III, Meem Gallery
- 2016: The Short Century, Sharjah Art Museum
- 1969: Inaugural Exhibition, The Sultan Gallery
- 1965: Solo Exhibition, Gallery One
- 1964: Munir Al-Khazi: Solo Exhibition, New Vision Centre Gallery
