= Saleh al-Badri =

- صالح البدري
- Born: 1893; Samarra, Ottoman Iraq
- Died: 1943 (aged 49–50); Baghdad, Kingdom of Iraq
- Education: Al-Rashdiya School
- Occupations: Poet, translator and novelist

Saleh al-Badri (1893 - 1943) was an Iraqi poet. He was born in the city of Samarra, Ottoman Iraq, where he was educated and then at Al-Rashdiya School in Baghdad. He worked as an employee in real estate departments in numbers of Iraqi cities. He was fluent in Turkish, translated into Arabic and had knowledge of French and Persian. He won local awards for Iraqi poetry competitions. His complete poetry collection collected by his son and called it Wishes. Al-Badri died in Baghdad.

== Life ==
Sayyid Saleh bin Mahdi bin Hussein bin Zahir al-Badri, was born in 1893 in Samarra. He grew up in Baghdad and completed his initial studies there, where he became acquainted with notables poets such as Marouf al-Rasafi, Jamil Sidqi al-Zahawi and Abdul Rahman al-Banaa. He held several positions in governmental real estate departments . He and his brother, Mahmoud al-Badri, contributed to the establishment of a private school in Baghdad called "Al-Tahzeeb Primary Private School". He had learned Turkish, Persian and French. Wrote many poets in nostalgia and tenderness, published them in the Iraqi newspapers. His son Walid Saleh Badri published his collection in 1959 and called it The Diwan of Wishes and reprinted in 1961, and also wrote The Innocent Criminal or Truth of Conceived printed in 1928.
Saleh al-Badri died in Baghdad in 1943.

== See also ==
- List of Iraqi poets
