= Nazik Al-Malaika =

Iraqi modernist poet

- نازك الملائكة
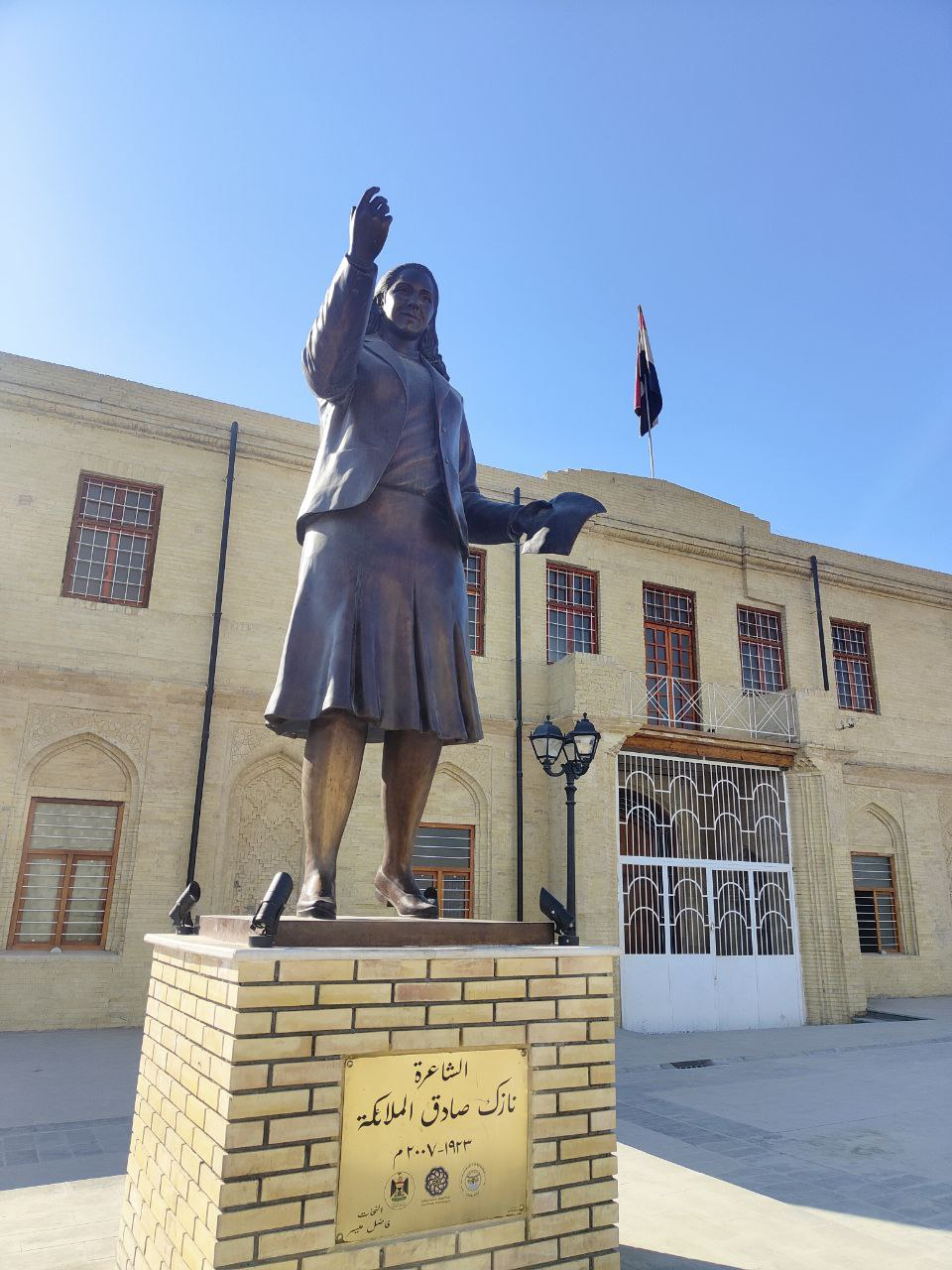
- A 2023 statute of Nazik Al-Malaika on Baghdad's Al-Saray street by iraqi sculptor Fadhel Messer
- Born: August 23, 1923; Baghdad, Kingdom of Iraq
- Died: June 20, 2007 (aged 83); Cairo, Egypt
- Writing career
- Language: Arabic
- Subject: Poetry

Nazik al-Malaika (Arabic: نازك الملائكة; 23 August 1923 – 20 June 2007) was an Iraqi poet. Al-Malaika is noted for being among the first Arabic poets to use free verse.

== Early life and career ==
Al-Malaika was born in Baghdad to a cultured family. Her mother Salma al-Malaika was also a poet, and her father was a teacher. She wrote her first poem at the age of 10. During her life, she studied English and French literature, Latin, and Greek poetry. Al-Malaika graduated in 1944 from the College of Arts in Baghdad and later completed a master's degree in comparative literature at the University of Wisconsin–Madison with a Degree of Excellence. She entered the Institute of Fine Arts and graduated from the Department of Music in 1949. In 1959 she earned a Master of Arts in Comparative Literature from the University of Wisconsin–Madison in the United States, and she was appointed professor at the University of Baghdad, the University of Basrah, and Kuwait University.

== Career ==
Al-Malaika taught at a number of schools and universities, most notably at the University of Mosul.

== Leaving Iraq ==
Al-Malaika left Iraq in 1970 with her husband Abdel Hadi Mahbooba and family, following the rise of the Arab Socialist Ba'ath Party of Iraq to power. She lived in Kuwait until Saddam Hussein's invasion in 1990. Al-Malaika and her family left for Cairo, where she lived for the rest of her life. Towards the end of her life, al-Malaika suffered from a number of health issues, including Parkinson's disease.

She died in Cairo in 2007 at the age of 83.

== Works ==
- "The Nights Lover" (عاشقة الليل), her first book of poetry, after her graduation;
- "The Cholera" (الكوليرا) (1947) is considered by critics as a revolution in modern Arabic poetry;
- "Shrapnel and Ashes" (شظايا ورماد) (1949);
- "Bottom of the Wave" (قرارة الموجة) (1957);
- "Tree of the Moon" (شجرة القمر) (1968);
- "The sea changes its color" ("يغير ألوانه البحر")(1977)

== Influence on other artists ==
One of her poems, Medinat al Hub, inspired the Iraqi artist and scholar, Issam al-Said to produce an artwork with the same name.

One of her poems, New Year, inspired the Lebanese Palestinian artist Jassem el Hindi to produce his performance Laundry of Legends.

== Translation in other languages ==
=== English ===
Emily Drumsta translated a selection of Al-Malaika's poems into English, collected in a book titled Revolt Against The Sun.

=== Nepali ===
Some of Al-Malaika's poems were translated into Nepali by Suman Pokhrel, and collected along with the works of other poets in an anthology titled Manpareka Kehi Kavita.

== See also ==
- Iraqi art
- List of Iraqi artists
- Amal Al Zahawi
- For Al-Malaika collections of poems, see also the Wikipedia entry in Arabic.

== Bibliography ==
- Al-Malaika, Nazik; Drumsta, Emily (29 October 2020). Revolt Under The Sun: The Selected Poetry of Nazik Al-Mala'ika: A Bilingual Reader. Saqi (published 2020). ISBN 978-0863563522.
