= Josyane De Jesus-Bergey =

Franco/Portuguese poet

Josyane de Jesus Bergey
- Born: 1941 (age 84–85); La Rochelle, France
- Occupation: Poet

Josyane de Jesus Bergey (born 1941) is a Franco/Portuguese poet.

== Biography ==
Josyane de Jesus Bergey was born in La Rochelle, France. She worked in the civil service.

She is the vice president of a French literary association "Larochellivre" based in La Rochelle. In this role, she organises literary meetings in the Charente Maritime, as well as events such as The Poets' Spring Time and the Salon of Poetry Works.

de Jesus Bergey is a close friend of Jean Bouhier who, together with Pierre Pernon, founded the poetic movement of the school of Rochefort "l'Ecole de Rochefort” in 1941. In 1991 she founded the Forest of one thousand poets at Vesdun (Cher) where 85 oak trees represent poets from 85 nations.

== Work ==
de Jesus Bergey's influences include Mediterranean culture and writers including Palestinian Mahmoud Darwish and the Algerian Mohamed Dib. Her texts have been translated into English by Angela Serna and into Portuguese by Ruth Motta.

=== Selected bibliography ===
- de Jesus-Bergey, Josyane (1995). L'heure Marine (Sea time). Nantes, France: Petit Véhicule.
- de Jesus-Bergey, Josyane (1996). Pour un soleil qui meurt (For a dying sun). France: Arcam.
- de Jesus-Bergey, Josyane (1997). De l'arbre à l'homme... jusqu'à l'épuisement de la saignée (From the tree to the man... till the end of the bleeding). Loire, France: La Bartavelle Editeur.
- de Jesus-Bergey, Josyane (1998). La brodeuse d´écume (The foam embroidery). Millau, France: Clapas.
- de Jesus-Bergey, Josyane (1998). L'eau Perride (The lost lake). Loire, France: La Bartavelle Editeur.
- de Jesus-Bergey, Josyane (1998). Le temps suspensif (The suspensive time). Montpellier, France: Encres vives.
- de Jesus-Bergey, Josyane (1999). Un cheval sur l'océan (A horse on the ocean). Montpellier, France: Encres vives.
- de Jesus-Bergey, Josyane (2000). Ne me raccompagnez pas, je suis pressée (Do not accompany me back, I am in a hurry). Loire, France: La Bartavelle Editeur.
- de Jesus-Bergey, Josyane (2000). Comme une confession de pierres - Eldjazaïr (Like a stone confession – Eldjazaïr). La Rochelle, France: Rumeur des Ages. ISBN 2843270758.
- de Jesus-Bergey, Josyane (2003). Ce n'est pas parce que la porte s'est refermée (The door closed on itself). La Rochelle, France: Rumeur des Ages.
- de Jesus-Bergey, Josyane (2004). BUS 25 pour rendre visite aux ombres (BUS 25 to call on the shadows). La Rochelle, France: Rumeur des Ages. ISBN 978-2843271045.
- de Jesus-Bergey, Josyane (2005). La Grande Boiterie (The big lameness). La Rochelle, France: Rumeur des Ages.
- de Jesus-Bergey, Josyane (2008). Le Poème Henri Meschonnic. France: Faire Part. 45 contributors including De Jesus-Bergey
- de Jesus-Bergey, Josyane (2008). Quebec 2008. Quebec, Canada: Écrits des Forges. Co-editor. 20 contributing authors from two continents.
- de Jesus-Bergey, Josyane (2009). Amulettes (Amulets). Normandy, France: Encre et Lumière. ISBN 9782915235531.
- de Jesus-Bergey, Josyane (2016). Alipio. Pont Aven, France: Vagamundo. ISBN 979-1092521115.

=== Artistic collaborations ===
She was involved in exhibitions with the following artists:

- 2006 with Joëlle Vassogne, La Rochelle
- 2006 with Hamid Tibouchi, Frontignan
- 2007 with Mohamed Oulhaci, Algeria
- 2008 La Grande Traversée (The great crossing) with Marc Mongeau, La Rochelle, Quebec including publication Voiles 2008 (Sails 2008)
- 2009 with Ana Sancuez Serrano, (Vitoria, Spain

=== Translation ===
- Poetic co-revision, with Mohamed Rafrafi, of the translation done by Hédia DRIDI from Arabic into French for the poems collection of the Iraqi poet Wafaa Abed Al Razzaq, entitled "From The War Child's Dairy" (Mémoires de l'enfant de la guerre) L'Harmattan Edition, December 2008

== Meetings and festivals ==
- 2005: Mediterranean Voices, poetry festival, Lodeve
- 2006: Poets' Springtime, Lodeve
- 2008: Vitoria-Gasteitz, Spain
- 2008: Poetry festival, organised by the National Centre of Translation, Tunis University
