= Abdel Hadi Mahbooba =

Abdel Hadi Mahbooba (d. 2005) was an Iraqi academic. He was the president of University of Basrah from 1964 to 1968. He was married to the Iraqi poet Nazik Al-Malaika.
