= Ward Badr Al Salim =

Iraqi writer

Ward Badr Abdulrida Salim
- وارد بدر عبدالرضى سالم
- Born: 1 July 1956 (age 70); Basrah, Iraq
- Education: Technical Diploma from the Institute of Applied Arts
- Alma mater: Institute of Applied Arts
- Occupations: Author, novelist, journalist
- Writing career
- Language: Arabic
- Subjects: Novels, short stories, texts
- Notable works: The Rise of Crow, The Wonders of Baghdad, Collecting the Lion
- Notable awards: Dubai's first prize for short story, and Ibn Batutta Prize for travel literature

Ward Badr Abdulrida Salim (وارد بدر عبدالرضا سالم; born 1 July 1956) is an Iraqi author, novelist, and journalist born in Basrah. He received a technical diploma from the Institute of Applied Arts. Salim is active in Iraqi journalism, and was editor-in-chief of Al Taliaah literature magazine for young authors. He also worked in Al Aqlam and Asfar magazines.

Salim also managed the cultural section for both Women Today (المرأة اليوم) Emirati magazine and AlBayan newspaper. He went back to Iraq in 2008 and worked as executive sub-editor in Baghdadi newspaper AlMada, and editor-in-chief of Al Sabah alJadeed newspaper.

Salim has published a number of notable works including novels, short story collections, texts, and op-eds, in addition to winning several awards.

In 2018, it was reported that Salim was arrested by Emirati authorities after he received an invitation to attend Al Owais Cultural Award ceremony in the UAE. According to these reports, the reason for arrest and what was coming next for him was unclear.

The Iraqi Ministry of Culture would follow up for updates with Salim's case through communicating with UAE Ambassador.

== Career and notable works ==
Salim published a number of notable works, including (The Wonders of Baghdad) and (Asabeh El Sard أصابع السرد), Due to his interest in travel literature, Salim published (Hindus Knocking the Door of the Sky) in 2010, along with texts titled (Lovers Guide) in 2015.

== List of publications ==
Publications
| Novels | Short Story Collections | Travel Literature & Texts |
|---|---|---|
| Cormorants – 2000 | That Beautiful Cry – 1983 | Hindus Knocking the Door of the Sky – 2010 |
| Piglike – 2004 | The Willow Fingers – 1987 | Lovers Guide - 2015 |
| The Rise of Crow – 2004 | Trunks in Iraq – 1988 | |
| The Wonders of Baghdad – 2012 | Our House – 1990 | |
| Collecting the Lion – 2014 | | |
| The Virgin of Singar – 2016 | | |
| The Republic of Mary - 2018 | | |

== Awards ==
Salim has won a number of literary awards, including Dubai's first prize for short story in 2007, for his short story collection (The American Bar), and Ibn Batutta Prize for travel literature in Abu Dhabi.

== Reviews ==
Fawzia Al Jaberi and Doaa Al Azoz said that the author, in his novels, tends to use settings that carry a realistic element, where he describes the scene in details that make it similar to reality as accurate as possible.

== See also ==
- Amal Al Zahawi
