= Qusay al-Shaykh Askar =

Iraqi novelist and poet

- قصي الشيخ عسكر
- Born: Qusay Abd al-Ra'uf Askar; 1951 (age 74–75); Nahr Jasim, Basra, Kingdom of Iraq
- Occupations: novelist; poet; literary scholar
- Writing career
- Language: Arabic, Danish

Qusay Abd al-Ra'uf Askar, commonly known as Qusay al-Shaykh Askar (Arabic: قصي الشيخ عسكر, romanized: Quṣayy al-Shaykh ʻAskar;1951) is an Iraqi-Danish novelist, poet and literary scholar. His first poetry collection was published in 1983 and his first novel in 1985, since then he has created many fictional works.

== Biography ==
Qusay Abd al-Ra'uf Askar was born in village of Nahr Jasim, Shatt Al-Arab District, east of Basra, Kingdom of Iraq in 1951. His family name derived from his grandfather first name, Askar, plus a title of honor, Sheikh, since he was the first imam of the Iraqi army at the beginning of its establishment in the 1920. He studied primary school in Shatt al-Arab and secondary school in al-Ashar, Basra. He received a BA in Arabic literature from Basra University, Department of Arabic Language, 1973–1984, and a MA in Arabic literature from Damascus University, 1984. Then he obtained PhD from the Islamic College, London, in 2004.

He taught in the secondary schools of Iraq, Morocco and Libya. Worked as a reporter for Asharq Al-Awsat newspaper, then emigrated to Denmark from Ba'athist Iraq. He worked as a broadcaster and program presenter for the Danish television, the Arabic section. He taught English at Cambridge Institute in Copenhagen for five years, and Danish language in schools of Denmark for three years. He held Iraqi citizenship then became a naturalized citizen of Denmark, and settled in Hellerup, then moved to Nottingham, United Kingdom, late 2000s. In Denmark, Al-Shaykh Askar founded the Arab Writers Union of Scandinavia and was chosen to head the union.

== Fiction ==
Iraqi academic and literary critic, Najm Kazim, in March 2017 published a list of the 100 best Iraqi novels of the twentieth century based on his “personal perception as a result of his long work in the field of literary criticism.” He placed three novels of Al-Shaykh Askar among them. Al-Shaykh Askar once stated that "In fact, what interests me without hesitation is Russian realism. Then I refrained from it and moved on to romanticism."

== Works ==
Novels:

- Arabic: المعبر, romanized: al-Maʻbar, 1985
- Arabic: سيرة رجل في التحولات الأولى, romanized: Sirat rajul fı̄ al-taḥawwulāt al-ūlá, 1986
- Arabic: المكتب, romanized: al-Maktab, 1989
- Arabic: شيء ما في المستنقع, romanized: Shayʼ mā fī al-mustanqaʻ, 1991
- Arabic: للحمار ذيل واحد لاذيلان, romanized: Lil-ḥimār dhayl wāḥid lā dhaylān, 1992
- Arabic: الشمس تقتحم مدينة الثلوج, romanized: al-Shams taqtaḥimu madīnat al-thulūj, 1993
- Arabic: المختار, romanized: al-Mukhtar, 1993
- Arabic: امرأة بستة أزواج - شهريار يهاجر للصمت المباح, romanized: Imra'ah bi-sittat azwāj ;Shahryār yuhājir lil-ṣamt al-mubāḥ, 1995
- Arabic: التجربه؛ النفق؛ الموتى يزحفون, romanized: al-Tajribah ;al-Nafaq ;al-Mawtá yazḥafūn, 1995
- Arabic: آخر رحلة للسندباد وروايات أخرى, romanized: Ākhir riḥlah lil-Sindabād wa-riwāyāt ukhrá, 1995
- Arabic: نهر جاسم, romanized: Nahr Jāsim, 2004
- Arabic: روايات وقصص من الخيال العلمي, romanized: riwāyāt wa-qiṣaṣ min al-khayāl al-ʻilmī, 2010
- Arabic: وأقبل الخريف مبكراً هذا العام, romanized: Wa-aqbala al-kharīf mubakkiran hadhā al-ʻām, 2011
- Arabic: من تنومتي يطلع القمر, romanized: Min tannūmati yaṭlaʻu al-qamar, 2013
- Arabic: المقصف الملكي, romanized: al-Maqṣaf al-malakī, 2013
- Arabic: الحبل والنار التي تسري, romanized: al-Ḥabl wa-al-nār allatī tasari, 2013
- Arabic: الثامنة والنصف مساءً, romanized: al-Thāminah wa-al-niṣf masāʼan, 2014
- Arabic: رسالة, romanized: Risalah, 2016
- Arabic: الرباط, romanized: al-Rabāṭ, 2017
- Arabic: قصة عائلة, romanized: Qiṣṣat ʻāʼilah, 2018
- Arabic: ربيع التنومة, romanized: Rabīʻ al-Tannūmah, 2019
- Arabic: زيزفون البحر, romanized: Zayzafūn al-baḥr, 2019
- Arabic: علاء الدين, romanized: ʻAlāʼ al-Dīn, 2020
- Arabic: أنا والشبيه, romanized: Anā wa-al-shabīh, 2021
- Arabic: كورونا, romanized: Kūrūnā, 2021
- Arabic: النهر يلقي إليك بحجر, romanized: al-Nahr yulqī ilayka bi-ḥajar, 2021

Poetry collection:

- Arabic: رؤية, romanized: Ruʼyah, 1983
- Arabic: صيف العطور الخرساء, romanized: Ṣayf al-ʻuṭūr al-kharsāʼ, 1985
- Arabic: عبير المرايا, romanized: ʻAbı̄r al-marāyā, 1985
- Arabic: رحلة الشمس والقمر, romanized: Riḥlat al-shams wa-al-qamar, 2002
- Arabic: الديوان الرشيق, romanized: al-Dīwān al-rashīq, 2019

Other genres:

- Arabic: المعجزة, romanized: al-Mu'jizah, short story collection

Literary studies:

- Arabic: البلاغة في تعاريف القدماء, romanized: Al-balāghah fī taʻārīf al-qudamāʼ, 1988
- Arabic: الحسن بن وهب، حياته، مقالاته، رسائله، شعره, lit. 'al-Ḥasan ibn Wahb : ḥayātuhu, maqālātuhu, rasāʼiluhu, shiʻruh', 1988
- Arabic: النجاشي، شاعر صفين, romanized: al-Najāshī : shāʻir ṣaffayn, 1988
- Arabic: قيم جمالية في نهج البلاغة, 1988
- Arabic: مفاهيم اقتصادية في نهج البلاغة, 1988
- Arabic: التشبيه والاستعارة في نهج البلاغة, 1988
- Arabic: الأسلوب القصصي في نهج البلاغة, 1988
- Arabic: الاغتراب في نهج البلاغة, 1989
- Arabic: الأساطير العربية قبل الإسلام وعلاقتها بالديانات القديمة, romanized: Asāṭīr al-ʻArabīyah qabla al-Islām wa-ʻalāqatuhā bi-al-diyānāt al-qadīmah, 2007
- Arabic: معجم الأساطير والحكايات الخرافية الجاهلية, romanized: Muʻjam al-asāṭīr wa-al-ḥikāyāt al-khurāfīyah al-Jāhilīyah, 2014
