= Amira Nur al-Din =

Iraqi poet (1925–2020)

- أميرة نور الدين
- Born: 1925; Baghdad, Mandatory Iraq
- Died: April 2020; Baghdad, Iraq
- Education: Cairo University
- Occupations: Poet and academic

Amira Nur al-Din Daoud (1925 – April 2020) was an Iraqi poet. Born in Baghdad. After completing her secondary education, she joined Fuad I University in Cairo in 1943, and BA in Arabic Language and Literature in 1947, and a master's degree from the same university in 1957. She worked as a teacher of Arabic in secondary schools, then at the Faculty of Arts of Baghdad, then dean of the Institute of Applied Arts. Published her poetry in many Iraqi and Arab magazines and newspapers.

== Life ==
Amira bint Nur al-Din/Noureddine Daoud was born in Baghdad into a family originally from Mosul, Her father came to Baghdad in the late Ottoman era for education. Amira Noureddine studied in Baghdad until high school, then moved to Cairo in 1943 and joined the Fuad I University and graduated with a degree in arts and then a master's degree in 1947. Worked as a teacher of Arabic literature in Iraq's secondary school and then in the Faculty of Arts, University of Baghdad, then as dean of the Institute of Applied Arts. In addition to Arabic, she mastered Turkish, Persian, English and French. She retired in 1984, and in 1996 appointed as an active member of the Iraqi Academy of Sciences.

== Poetry ==
Her first poetic attempts were in the early 1940s and was influenced by Arab romantic poets, including Ali Mahmoud Taha, as well as Khalil Gibran and Elia Abu Madi. Her poetry is "perfect, realistic, varied, beautifully innovative imaged" in the opinion of Imil Badi' Ya'qub. Her father, Nur al-Din Daoud who died in January 1955, encouraged her to work on poetry and She studied Arabic prosody before going to university and was very active while studying in Cairo. Published her poetry in many Iraqi and Arab magazines and newspapers.

== Works ==
- Appeals and shades, a collection of poetry.

Also a book on poetry of Muhammad Iqbal.

== See also ==
- Amal Al Zahawi
- 'Atika Wahbi al-Khazraji
- Wafaa Abed Al Razzaq
