= Samarra =

City in Saladin Governorate, Iraq

Samarra سَامَرَّاء
- City
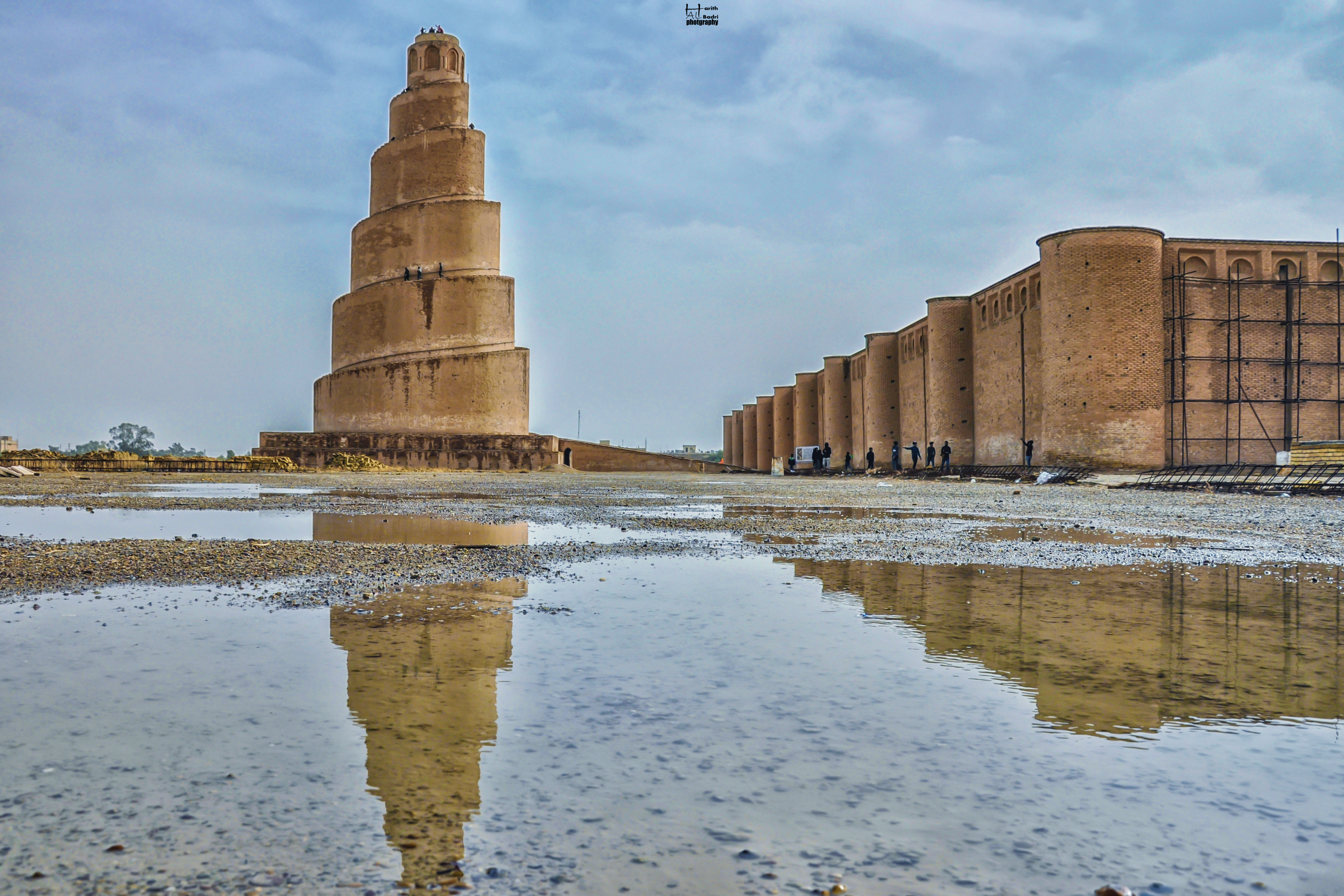
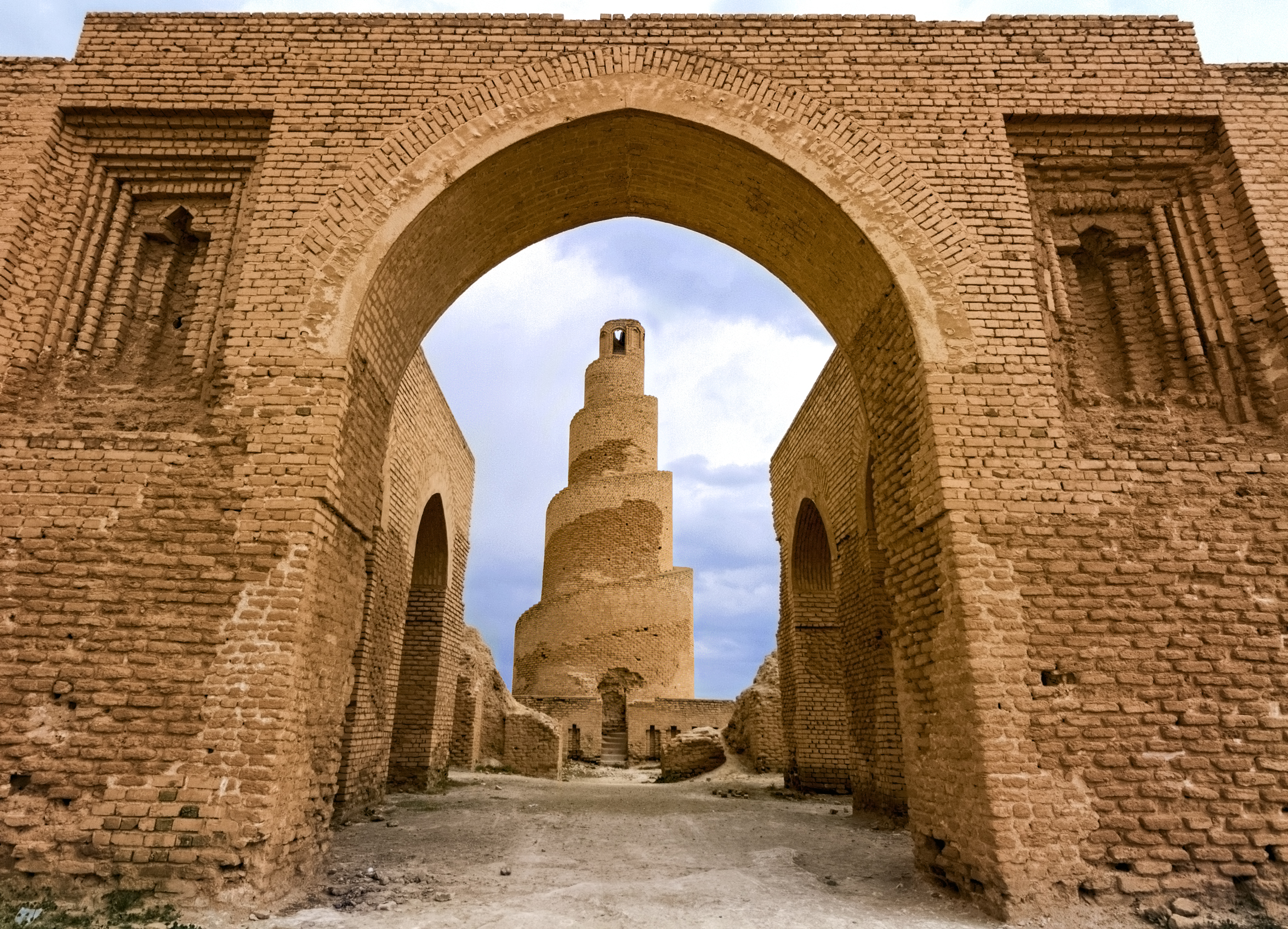
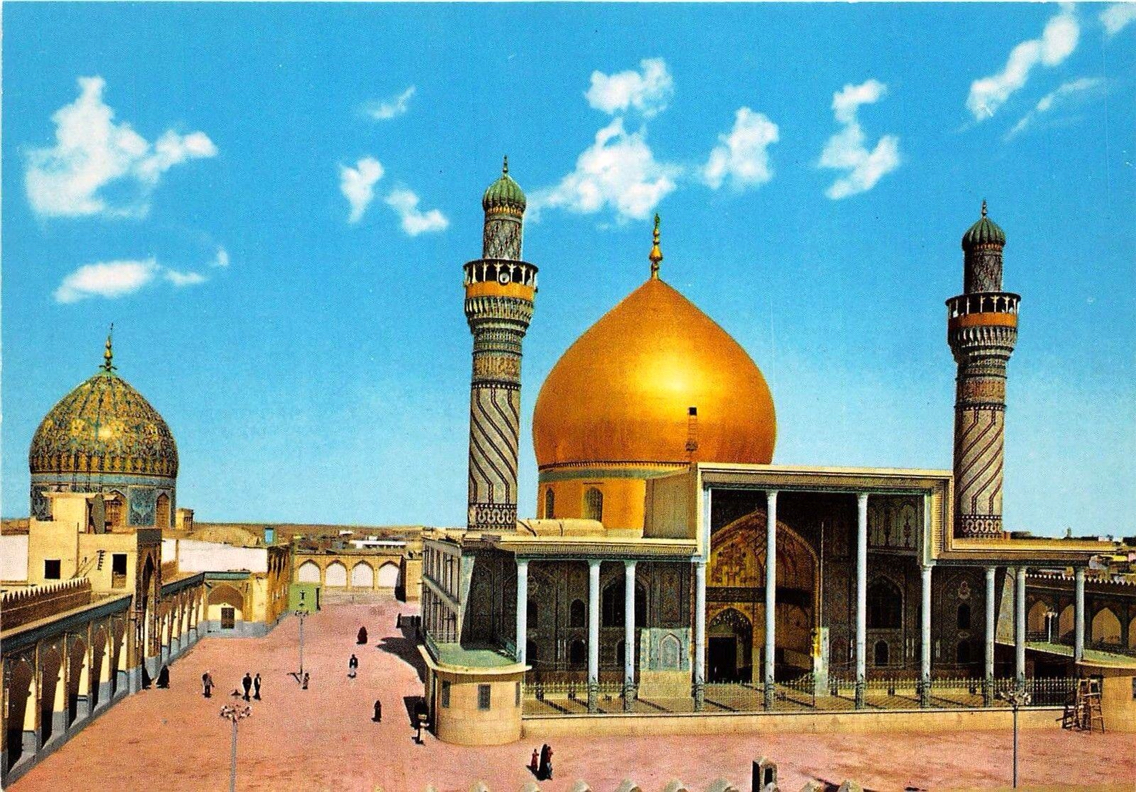
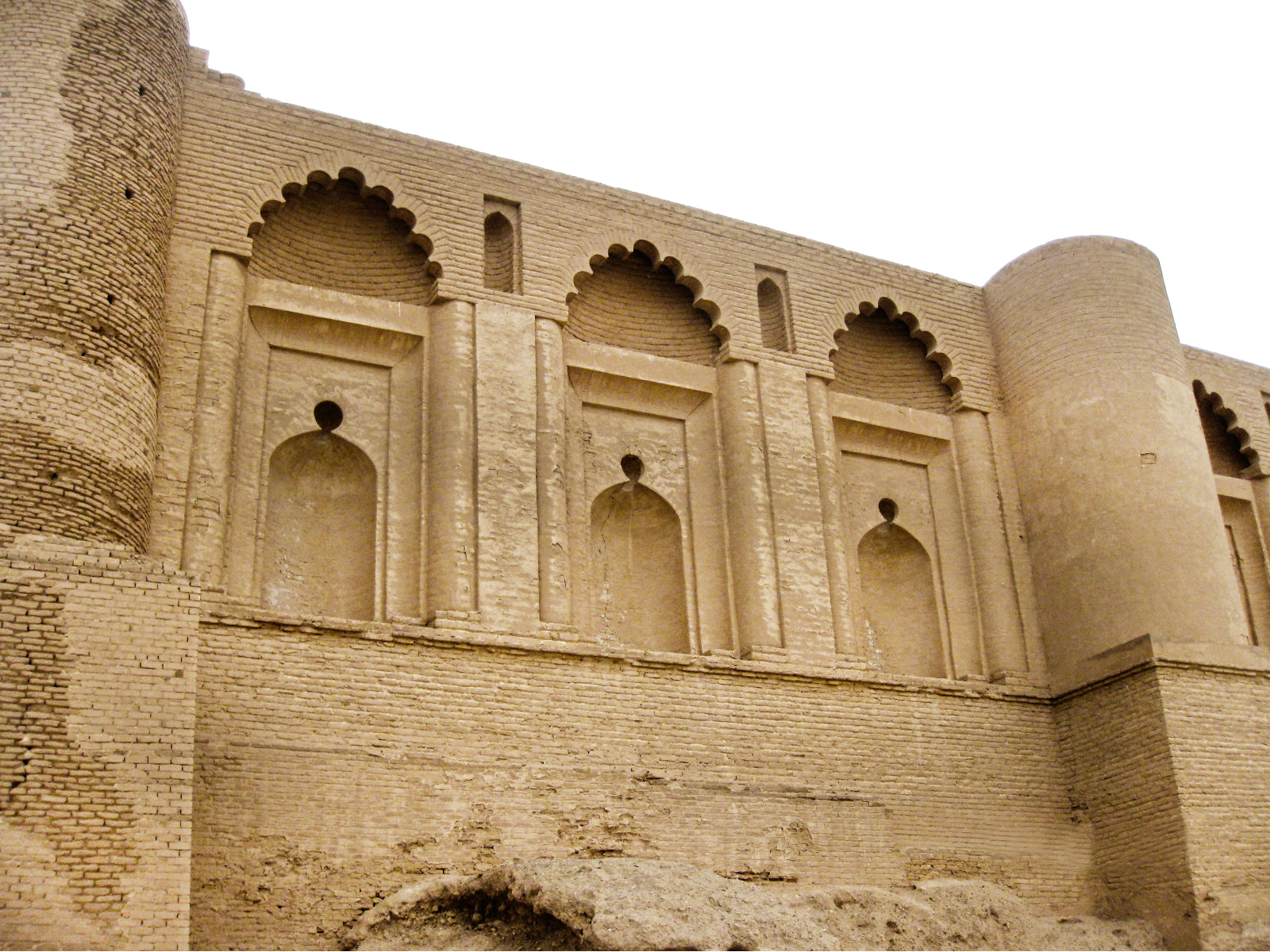
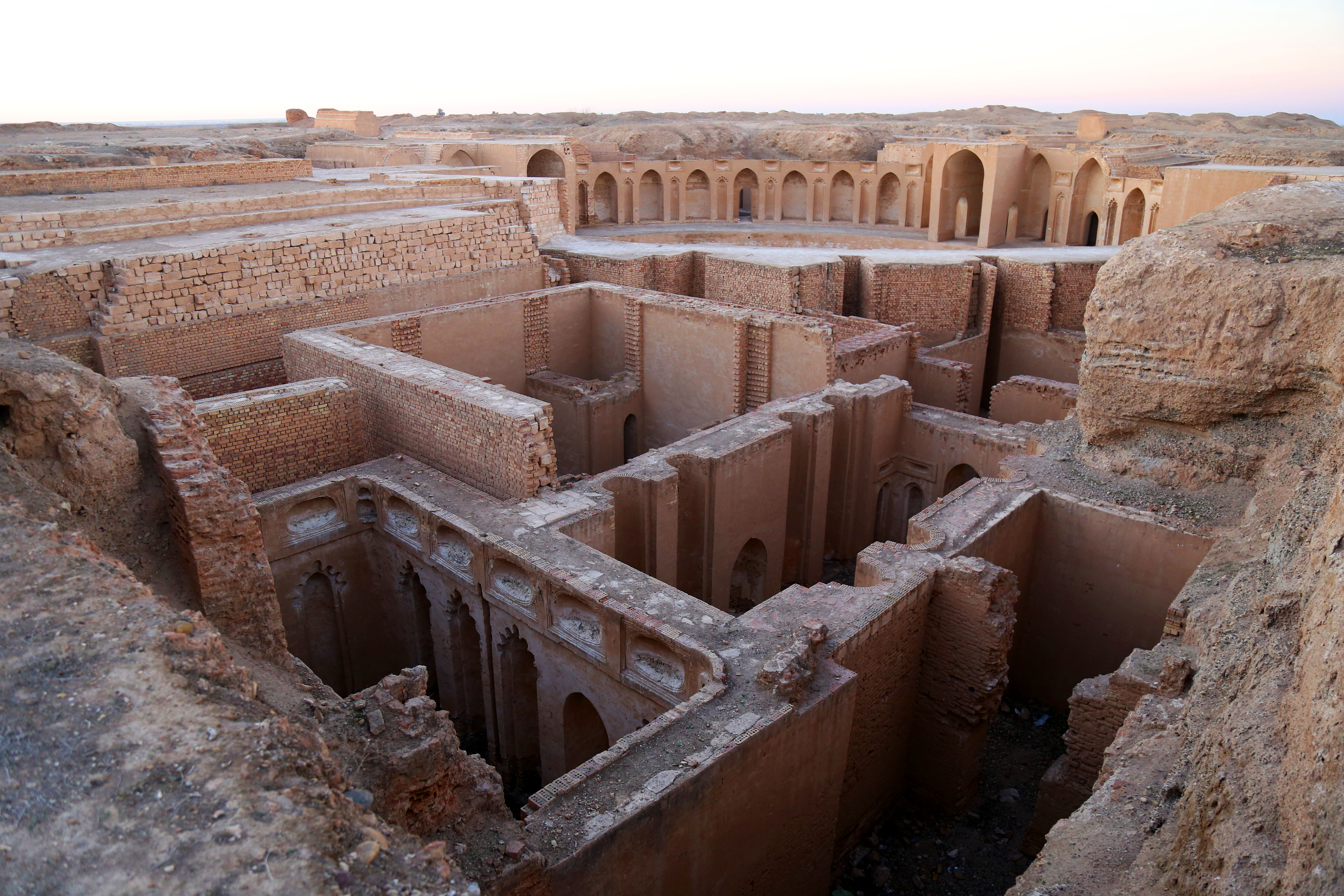
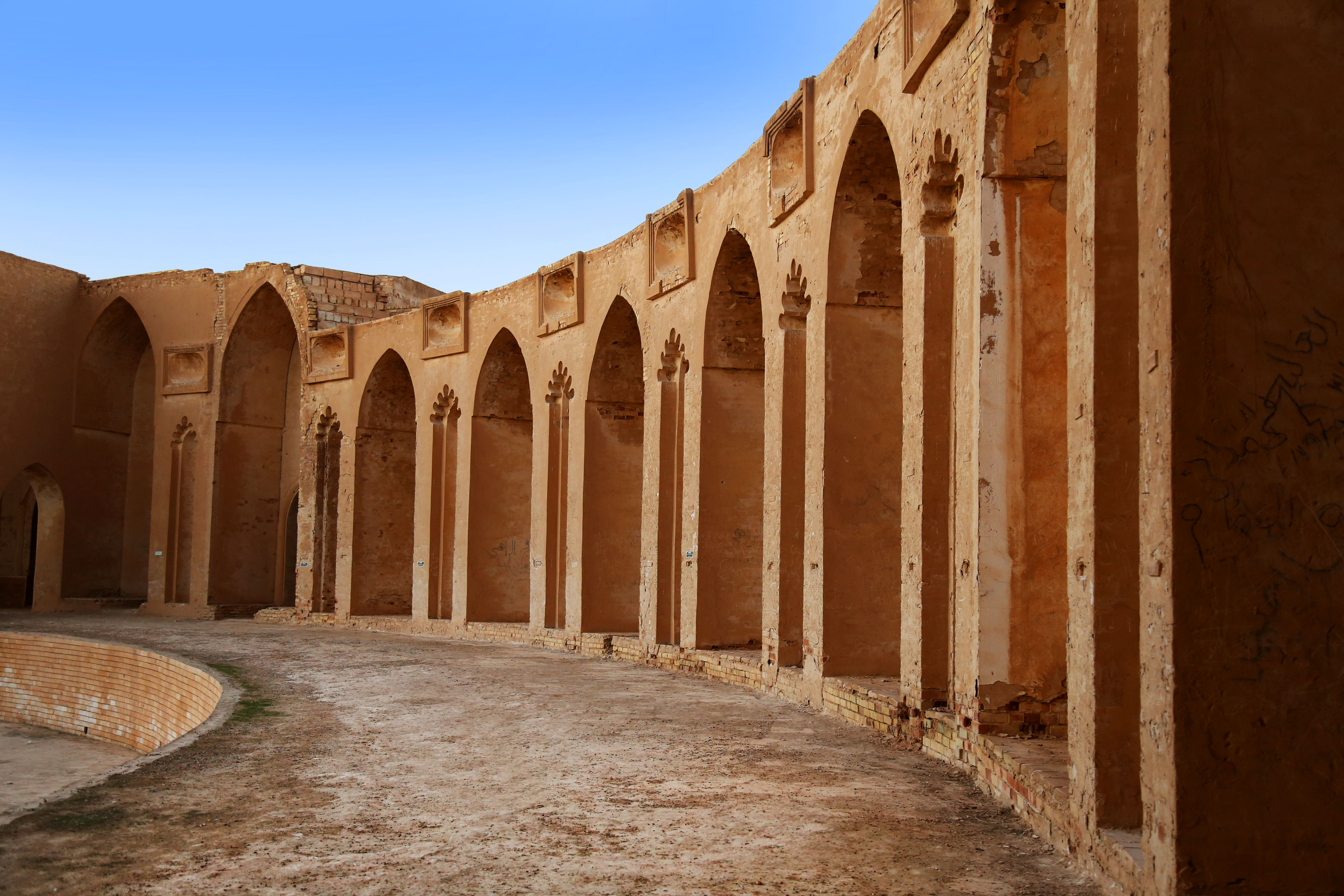
- The spiral minaret of the Great Mosque of Samarra Abu Dulaf Mosque Al-Askari Shrine Qasr al-'Ashiq Remains of the Dar al-Khilafa (caliph's palace) Circular pool area inside the Dar al-Khilafa

- Location of Samarra within Iraq
- Coordinates: 34°11′54″N 43°52′27″E
- Country: Iraq
- Governorate: Saladin

Population (2003 est)
  - Total: 348,700
  - Estimate (859): 204,868

UNESCO World Heritage Site
- Official name: Samarra Archaeological City
- Criteria: Cultural: ii, iii, iv
- Reference: 276
- Inscription: 2007 (31st Session)
- Endangered: 2007-
- Area: 15,058 ha (37,210 acres)
- Buffer zone: 31,414 ha (77,630 acres)

Samarra (Arabic: سَامَرَّاء, Sāmarrāʾ) is a city in Iraq. It stands on the east bank of the Tigris in the Saladin Governorate, 125 kilometers (78 mi) north of Baghdad. Due to the presence of Al-Askari Shrine, the city is considered a holy site in Shia Islam. The modern city of Samarra was founded in 836 CE by the Abbasid caliph al-Mu'tasim as a new administrative capital and military base.

In 2003 the city had an estimated population of 348,700. During the Iraqi Civil War (2006–2008), Samarra was in the "Sunni Triangle" of resistance. The archeological site of Samarra still retains much of the historic city's original plan, architecture and artistic relics. In 2007, UNESCO designated it a World Heritage Site.

== History ==
=== Prehistoric Samarra ===
The remains of prehistoric Samarra were first excavated between 1911 and 1914 by the German archaeologist Ernst Herzfeld and Friedrich Sarre. Samarra became the type site for the Samarra culture. Since 1946, the notebooks, letters, unpublished excavation reports and photographs have been in the Freer Gallery of Art in Washington, D.C.

The civilization flourished alongside the Ubaid period, as one of the first town states in the Near East. It lasted from 5,500 BCE and eventually collapsed in 3,900 BCE.

=== Neo-Assyrian period ===
A city of Sur-marrati (refounded by Sennacherib in 690 BC according to a stele in the Walters Art Museum) is insecurely identified with a fortified Assyrian site at al-Huwaysh on the Tigris opposite modern Samarra. The State Archives of Assyria Online identifies Surimarrat as the modern site of Samarra.

Ancient place names for Samarra noted by the Samarra Archaeological Survey are Greek Souma (Ptolemy V.19, Zosimus III, 30), Latin Sumere, a fort mentioned during the retreat of the army of Julian in 363 AD (Ammianus Marcellinus XXV, 6, 4), and Syriac Sumra (Hoffmann, Auszüge, 188; Michael the Syrian, III, 88), described as a village.

The possibility of a larger population was offered by the opening of the Qatul al-Kisrawi, the northern extension of the Nahrawan Canal which drew water from the Tigris in the region of Samarra, attributed by Yaqut al-Hamawi (Muʿjam, see under "Qatul") to Khosrau I (531–578). To celebrate the completion of this project, a commemorative tower (modern Burj al-Qa'im) was built at the southern inlet south of Samarra, and a palace with a "paradise" or walled hunting park was constructed at the northern inlet (modern Nahr ar-Rasasi) near ad-Dawr. A supplementary canal, the Qatul Abi al-Jund, excavated by the Abbasid Caliph Harun al-Rashid, was commemorated by a planned city laid out in the form of a regular octagon (modern Husn al-Qadisiyya), called al-Mubarak and abandoned unfinished in 796.

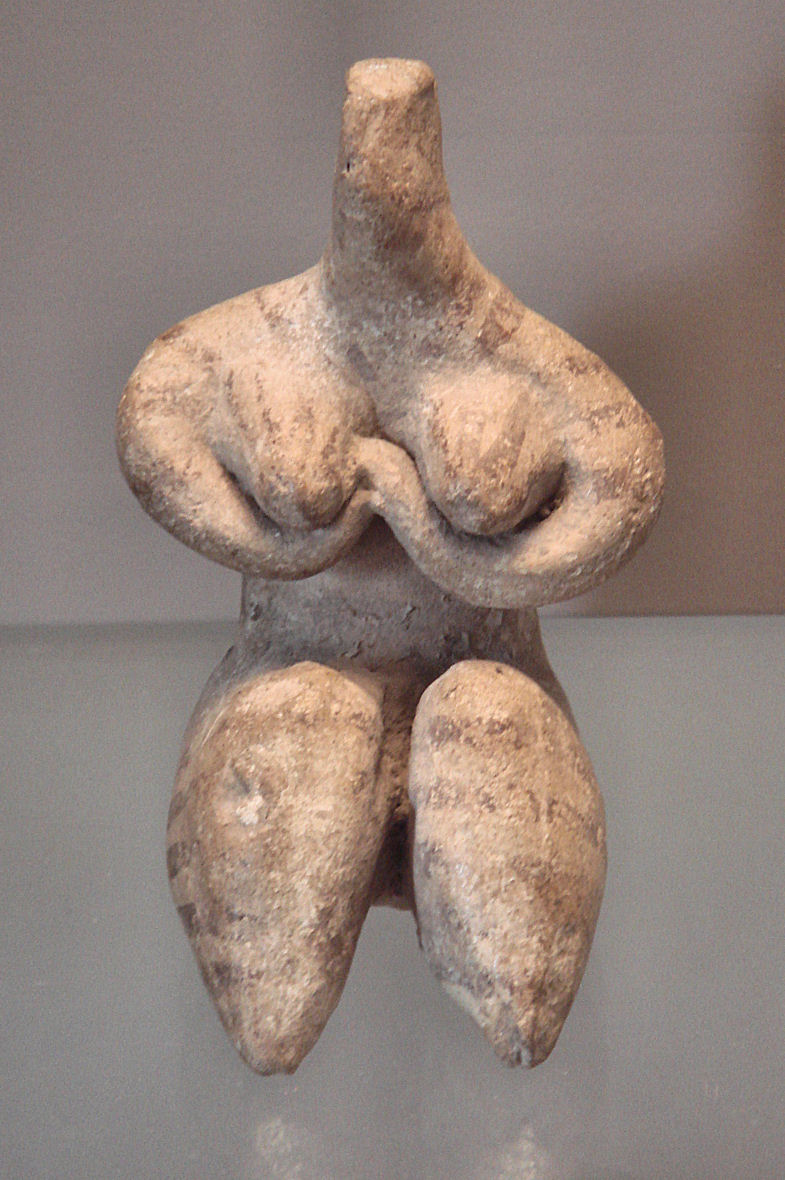
Female statuette, Samarra, 6000 BC

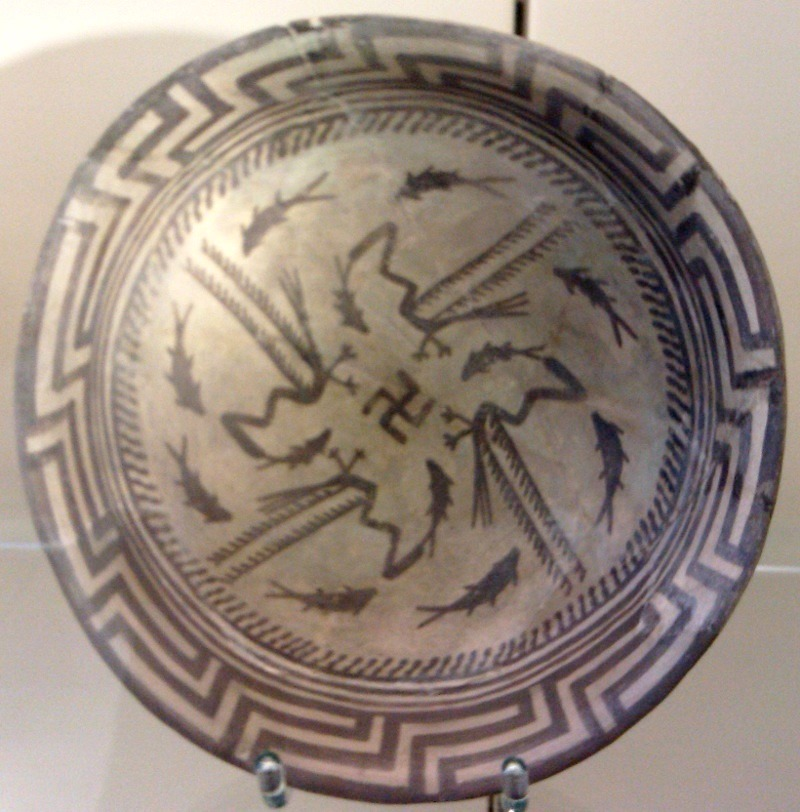
The Samarra bowl at the Vorderasiatisches Museum, Berlin. The swastika in the center of the design is a reconstruction.

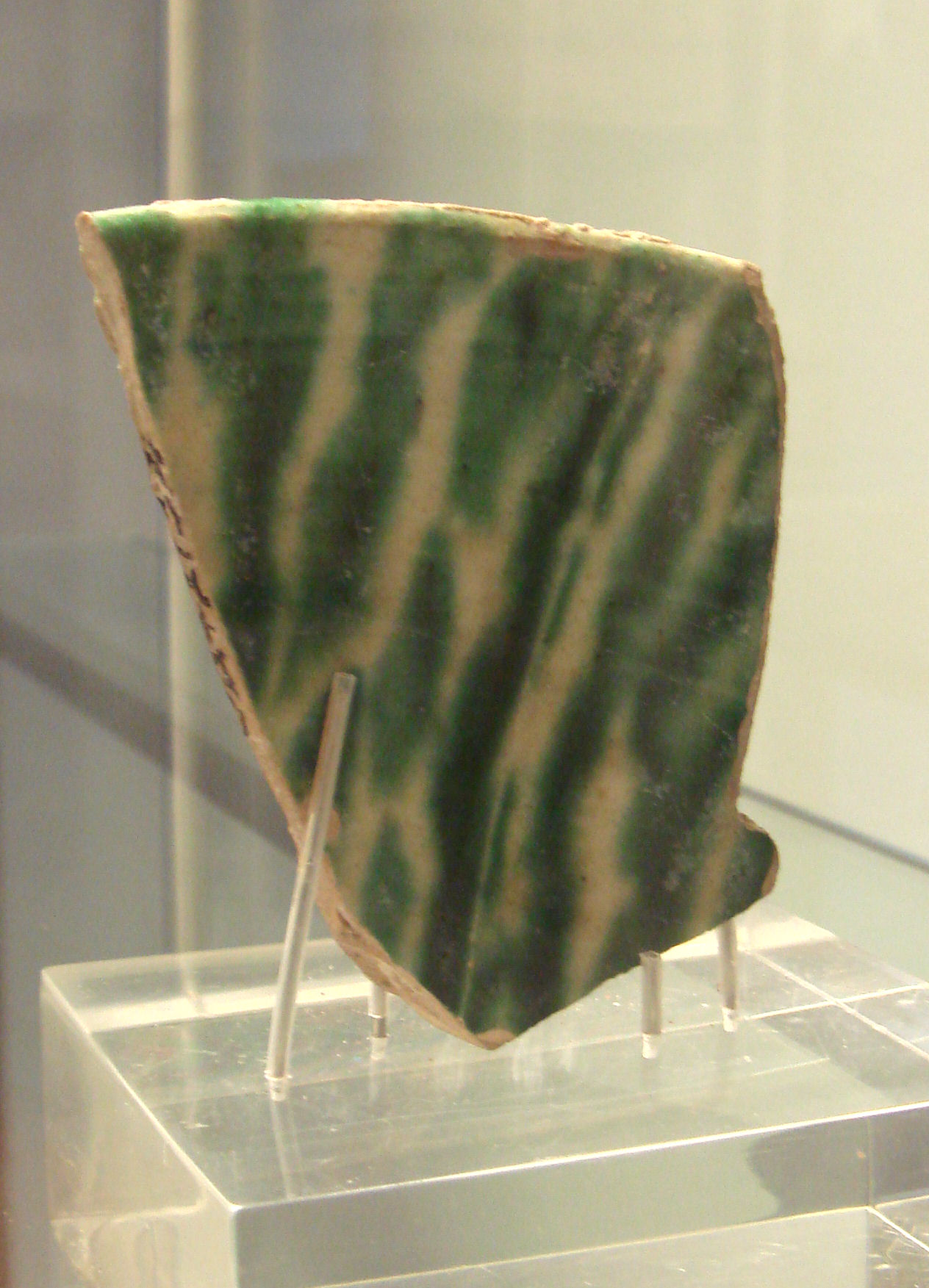
Chinese-made sancai pottery shard, 9th–10th century, found in Samarra, an example of Chinese influences on Islamic pottery. British Museum.

=== Abbasid capital ===
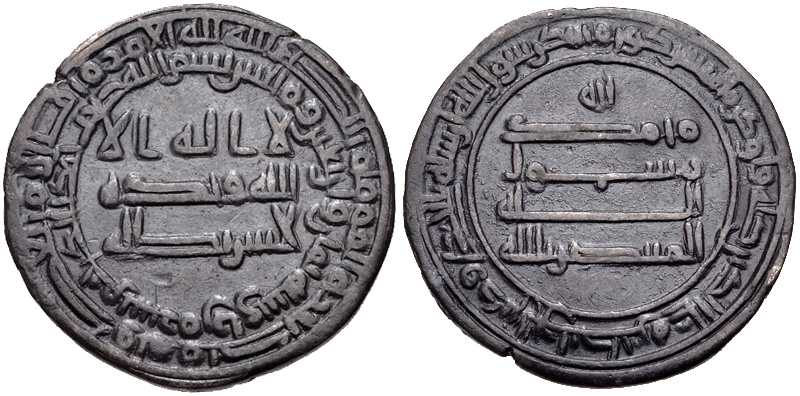
Dirham of Al-Muntasir minted in Samarra, 861/862 AD

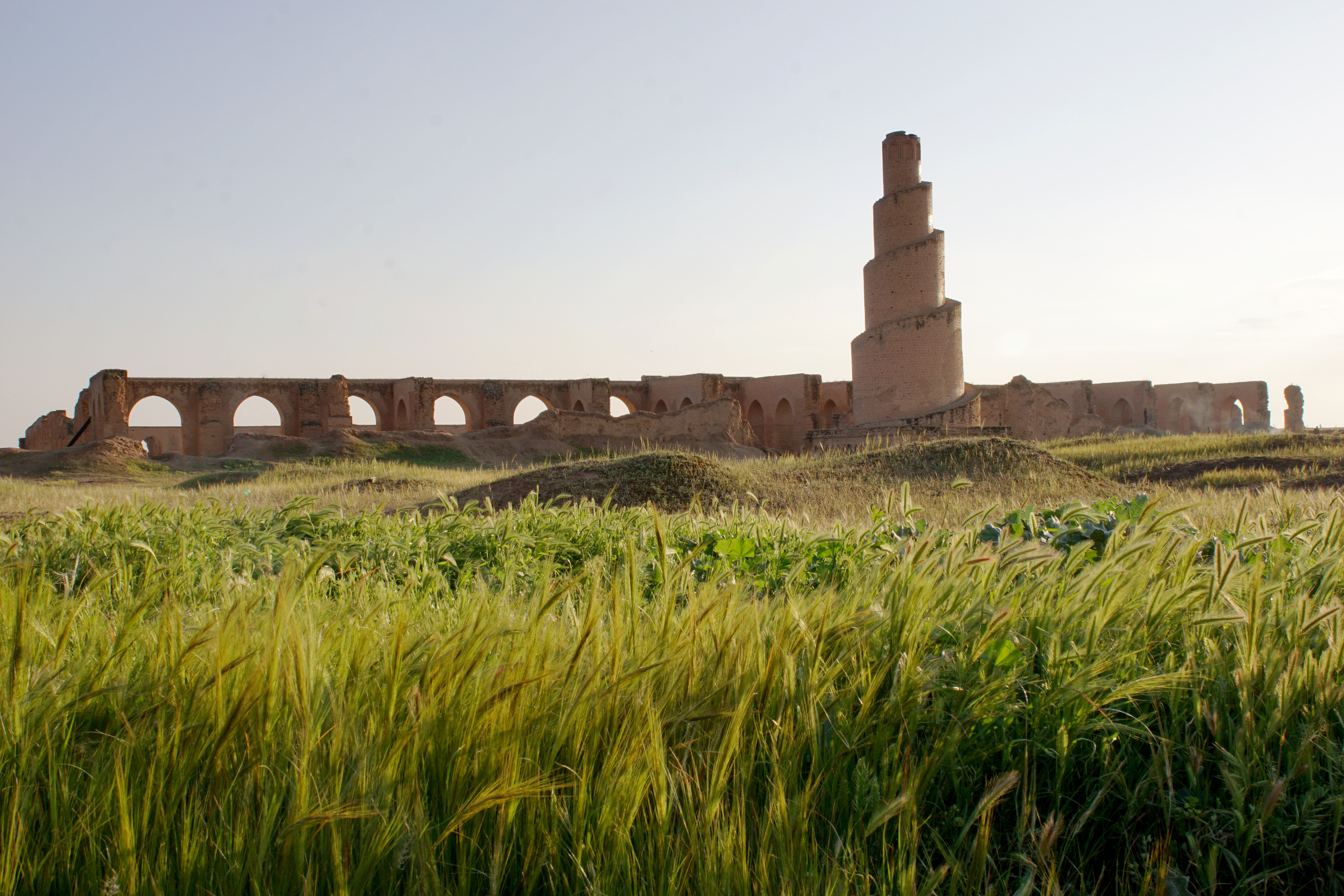
The Abu Dulaf Mosque, built by Caliph Al-Mutawakkil in 859 CE, features a spiral minaret similar to the Great Mosque of Samarra.

Abbasid Samarra Map

In 836 CE, the Abbasid Caliph Al-Mu'tasim founded a new capital at the banks of the Tigris. Here he built extensive palace complexes surrounded by garrison settlements for his guards, mostly drawn from Central Asia and Iran (most famously the Turks, as well as the Iranian Khurasani Ishtakhaniyya, Faraghina and Ushrusaniyya regiments) or North Africa (like the Maghariba). Although quite often called Mamluk slave soldiers, their status was quite elevated; some of their commanders bore Sogdian titles of nobility.

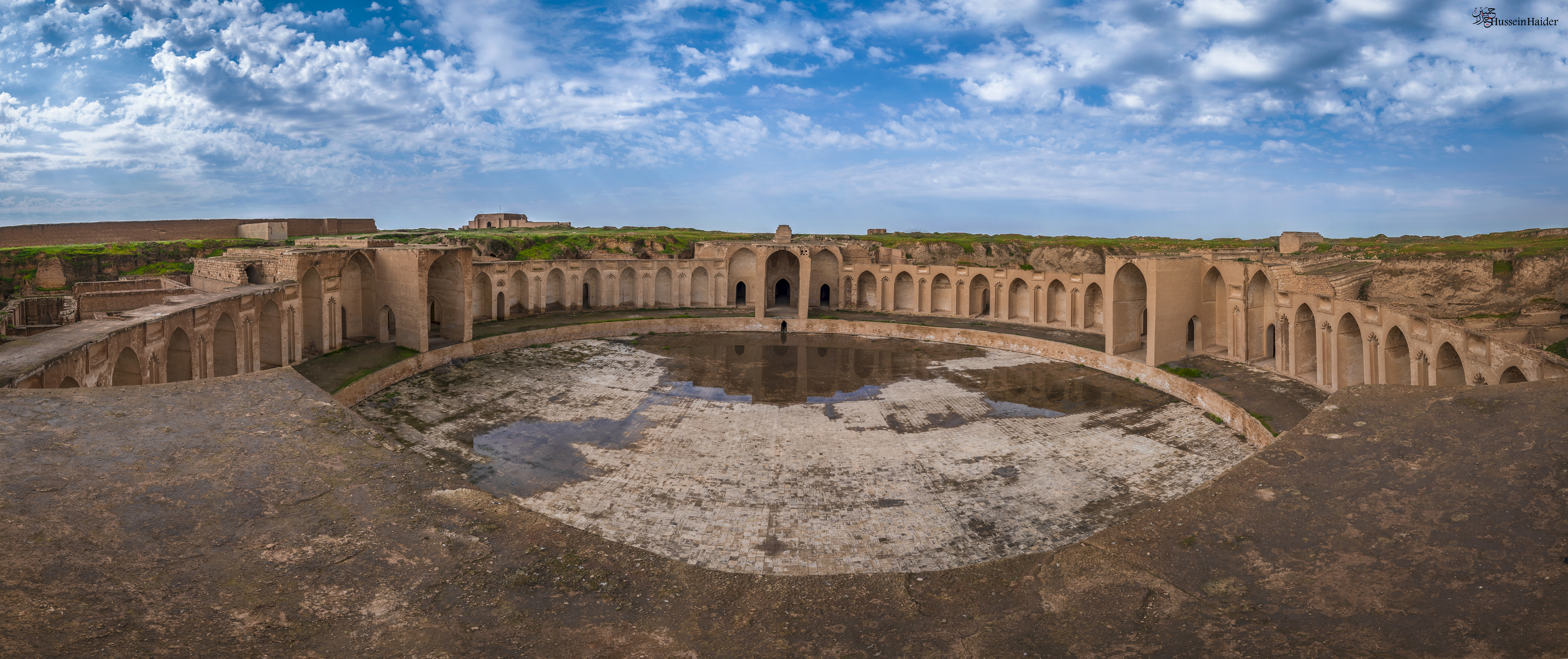
Remains of a circular pool surrounded by reception halls in the Dar al-Khilafa (caliph's palace), built by Al-Mu῾tasim (r. 833–842)

The city was further developed under Caliph al-Mutawakkil, who sponsored the construction of lavish palace complexes, such as al-Mutawakkiliyya, and the Great Mosque of Samarra with its famous spiral minaret or Malwiya, built-in 847. For his son al-Mu'tazz he built the large palace Bulkuwara.

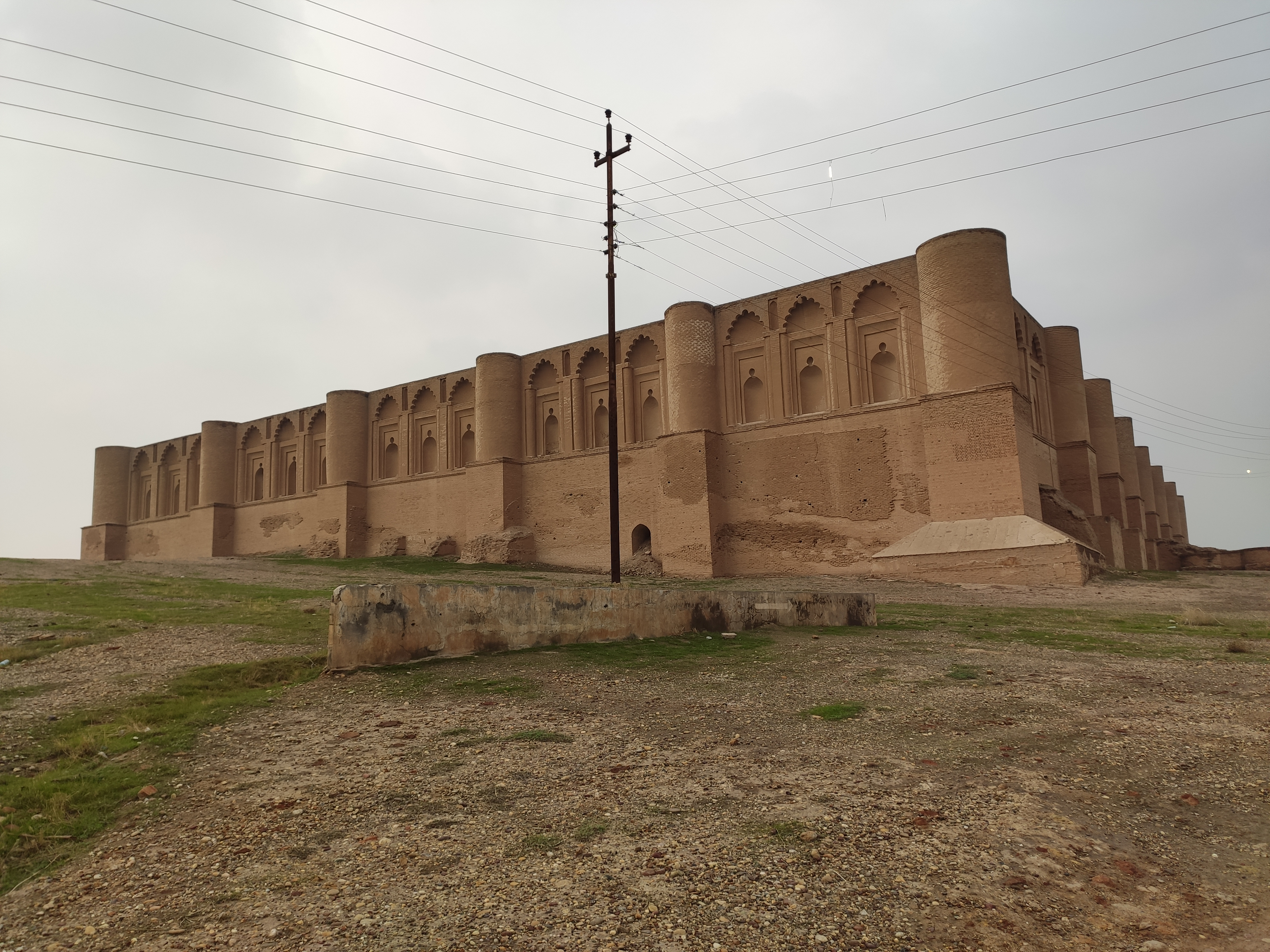
Qasr al-'Ashiq, an Abbasid-era palace near Samarra

The Nestorian patriarch Sargis (860–872) moved the patriarchal seat of the Church of the East from Baghdad to Samarra, and one or two of his immediate successors may also have sat in Samarra so as to be close to the seat of power.

Samarra remained the residence of the caliph until 892, when al-Mu'tadid returned the capital to Baghdad. Historical sources report that the city was looted around this time. Its population probably decreased and the city declined, but it remained an important market center.

From the tenth century onward it turned into an important pilgrimage site. During the 12th and 13th centuries, the river's course to the south of the city shifted further east. As a result, the main road between Baghdad and Mosul was moved to the west bank and Samarra lost its importance as a trading town.

=== Modern era ===
In the eighteenth century, one of the most violent battles of the 1730–1735 Ottoman–Persian War, the Battle of Samarra, took place, where over 50,000 Ottomans and Persians became casualties. The engagement decided the fate of Ottoman Iraq and kept it under Istanbul's suzerainty until the First World War.

During the 1950s, Samarra gained new importance when a permanent lake, Lake Tharthar, was created through the construction of the Samarra Barrage, which was built in order to prevent the frequent flooding of Baghdad. Many local people were displaced by the dam, resulting in an increase in Samarra's population.

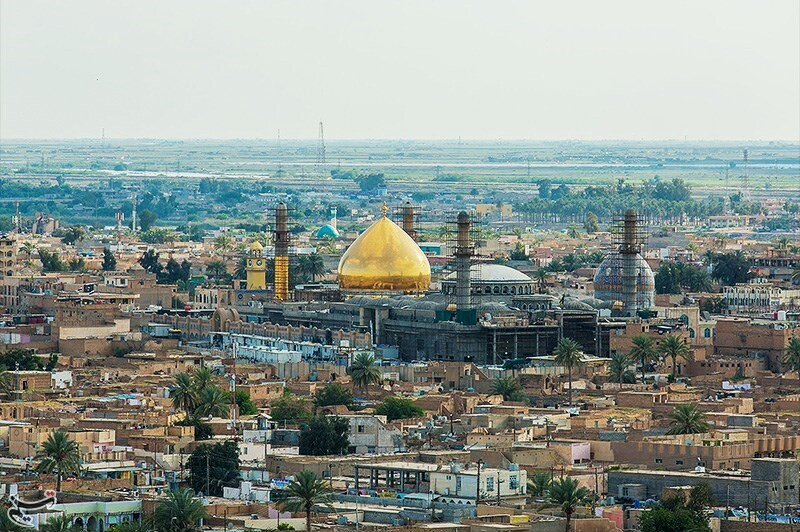
Al-Askari Shrine

Samarra is a key city in Saladin Governorate, a major part of the so-called Sunni Triangle where insurgents were active during the Iraq War. Though Samarra is famous for its Shi'i holy sites, including the tombs of several Shi'i Imams, the town was traditionally and until very recently, dominated by Sunni Arabs. Tensions arose between Sunnis and the Shi'a during the Iraq War. On February 22, 2006, the golden dome of the al-Askari Mosque was bombed by Al-Qaeda in Iraq, setting off a period of rioting and reprisal attacks across the country which claimed hundreds of lives. No organization claimed responsibility for the bombing. On June 13, 2007, Sunni insurgents attacked the mosque again and destroyed the two minarets that flanked the dome's ruins. On July 12, 2007, the clock tower was blown up. No fatalities were reported. Shiʿi cleric Muqtada al-Sadr called for peaceful demonstrations and three days of mourning. He stated that he believed no Sunni Arab could have been behind the attack, though according to the New York Times the attackers were probably Sunni militants linked to Al-Qaeda. The mosque compound was closed after the 2006 bombing and an indefinite curfew was placed on the city by the Iraqi police at the time. In 2009, the mosque reopened while restoration was ongoing.

Ever since the end of Iraqi civil war in 2007, the Shia population of the holy city has increased exponentially. However, violence has continued, with bombings taking place in 2011 and 2013. In June 2014, the city was attacked by the Islamic State of Iraq and the Levant (ISIL) as part of their Northern Iraq offensive. ISIL forces captured the municipality building and university, but were later repulsed by the Iraqi army and SWAT forces after capturing the city and holding it for two days. The nearby Imam Dur Mausoleum, a historic mausoleum dedicated to Muslim ibn Quraysh, a Shi'i ruler, was destroyed by ISIL in 2014.

== Geography ==
=== Climate ===
Samarra has a hot desert climate (Köppen climate classification BWh). Most rain falls in the winter. The average annual temperature in Samarra is 22.7 °C (72.9 °F). About 171 mm (6.73 in) of precipitation falls annually.

Climate data for Samarra
Month	Jan	Feb	Mar	Apr	May	Jun	Jul	Aug	Sep	Oct	Nov	Dec	Year
Mean daily maximum °C (°F)	15.3 (59.5)	18.0 (64.4)	22.1 (71.8)	28.3 (82.9)	35.7 (96.3)	41.1 (106.0)	43.9 (111.0)	43.6 (110.5)	39.7 (103.5)	33.2 (91.8)	24.4 (75.9)	17.4 (63.3)	30.2 (86.4)
Mean daily minimum °C (°F)	4.4 (39.9)	5.9 (42.6)	9.3 (48.7)	14.2 (57.6)	19.6 (67.3)	23.5 (74.3)	25.9 (78.6)	25.4 (77.7)	21.4 (70.5)	16.4 (61.5)	10.6 (51.1)	5.8 (42.4)	15.2 (59.4)
Average precipitation mm (inches)	25 (1.0)	30 (1.2)	29 (1.1)	21 (0.8)	8 (0.3)	0 (0)	0 (0)	0 (0)	0 (0)	4 (0.2)	20 (0.8)	34 (1.3)	127 (5.0)
Source: climate-data.org

== Religious significance ==
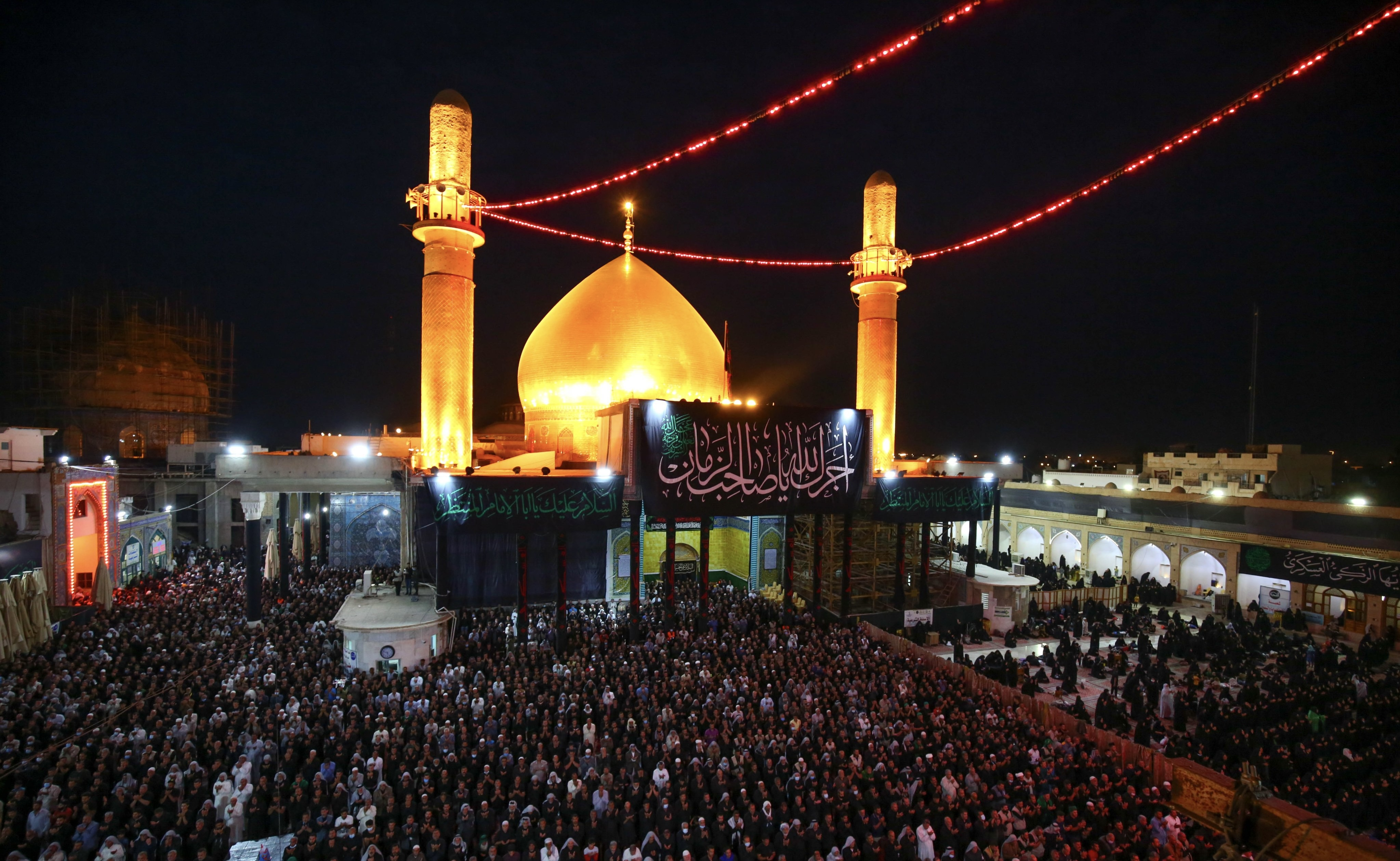
Al-Askari Shrine

The city is also home to al-Askari Shrine, containing the mausolea of the Imams Ali al-Hadi and Hasan al-Askari, the tenth and eleventh Shiʿi Imams, respectively. This has made it an important pilgrimage centre for the Imami Shias. In addition, Hakimah and Narjis, female relatives of the Islamic prophet Muhammad and the Imams, held in high esteem by Muslims, are buried there, making this mosque one of the most significant sites of worship.

== Sports ==
Samarra is home to the Samarra SC, that plays in the second highest division of the Iraqi football league system, namely Iraqi Premier Division League. Its ground is the Samarra Stadium.

== In popular culture ==
The metaphor of "Having an appointment in Samarra", signifying death, is a literary reference to an ancient Babylonian myth recorded in the Babylonian Talmud and transcribed by W. Somerset Maugham, in which Death narrates a man's futile attempt to escape him by fleeing from Baghdad to Samarra. The story "The Appointment in Samarra" subsequently formed the germ of a novel of the same name by John O'Hara. The original story was retold in verse by F. L. Lucas in his poem "The Destined Hour" in From Many Times and Lands (1953).

In the 1968 film Targets, Byron Orlok, an aging horror film star played by Boris Karloff, tells Maugham's version of the story to his younger colleagues.

The story is told in "The Six Thatchers", a 2017 episode of Sherlock.

== Notable people ==
- Ahmed Abdul Ghafoor, former head of the Sunni Endowment Office with the rank of Minister.
- Ahmed Hassan Al-Taha, the most senior scholar of the Sunni sect in Iraq, university professor, Imam and preacher at the Abu Hanifa Mosque and member of the Supreme Council of the Iraqi Jurisprudence Assembly of Senior Scholars for Preaching and Fatwa.
- Saleh al-Badri (1893–1943), poet
- Abu Bakr al-Baghdadi (1971–2019), Iraqi militant leader who led the Islamic State and its predecessor group the Islamic State of Iraq from 2010 until his death in 2019.

== See also ==
- List of places in Iraq

== Selected bibliography ==
- De la Vaissière, Étienne (2007): Samarcande et Samarra. Élites d’Asie central dans l’empire abbaside (Studia Iranica, Cahier 35), Paris.
- Gordon, Matthew S. (2001). The Breaking of a Thousand Swords: A History of the Turkish Military of Samarra (A.H. 200–275/815–889 C.E.). Albany, New York: State University of New York Press. ISBN 0-7914-4795-2.
- Northedge, Alastair (2005): The historical topography of Samarra, London.
- Robinson, Chase (ed.) (2001): A Medieval Islamic City Reconsidered: An Interdisciplinary Approach to Samarra (Oxford Studies in Islamic Art 14). Oxford.
