= Ali Abbass Alwan =

Iraqi academic

Ali Abbass Alwan is an Iraqi academic. He was president of the University of Basrah from 2005 to 2009.
