= Amal Al Zahawi =

Iraqi poet and writer

Amal A. Al Zahawi
- Born: 1946, Baghdad
- Died: 11 February 2015
- Resting place: Shuhadaa Al-Adhamiyah Cemetery in Baghdad.
- Education: University of Baghdad
- Occupations: Poet, writer
- Spouse: Odai Najim
- Writing career
- Language: Arabic
- Notable works: The Commando and The Beast, Beirut, 1969. Those Who Venture Seas of Death, Beirut, 1970. A Circle in The Light, A Circle in The Dark, Baghdad, 1975.

Amal A. Al Zahawi (Arabic:آمال الزهاوي) (1946 – 13 February 2015) was an Iraqi poet and writer. She was born in Baghdad and graduated from the University of Baghdad. She published her works in various Arabic magazines and started her career in the sixties. Some of her poetry collections include "The Commando and The Beast" in 1969, "Those Who Venture Seas of Death" in 1970 and "A Circle in The Light, A Circle in The Dark" in 1975. Al Zahawi was an active writer in literature. She had also written many political articles for the Arabic press. Amal Al Zahawi died at the age of 71, after suffering a stroke in Baghdad. She was buried in Shuhadaa Al-Adhamiyah Cemetery in Baghdad.

== Lineage ==
She is Amal Abdulqadir Saleh Muhammad Faydi Al-Zahawi. The poet's lineage goes back to the Al-Zahawi family, which is known both politically and literally in Iraq. She is the granddaughter of the Mufti Sheikh Muhammad Faydi, the head of the Al-Zahawi family.

== Childhood ==
Amal Al Zahawi was raised in the literary and political environment of her family, which shaped her personality and ideals. She began writing at the young age of thirteen years old.

== Career ==
Al Zahawi received her BA in Arabic Language from the University of Baghdad. She published her works in various Arabic magazines and started her career in the sixties. She had also written many political articles for the Arabic press, particularly on Iraq and Syria. Al Zahawi was the founder the "Alf Ba" Iraqi magazine.

Al Zahawi and her husband established a printing company that includes a publishing house under the name of the Ishtar Company for Printing, Publishing and Distribution, the company's name was later changed to "Amal Al Zahawi’s Publications". She contributed to printing many literary works of young poets and writers and supporting their upstart.

== Poetry collections ==
Some of her poetry collections include:

The Commando and The Beast, Beirut, 1969.

Those Who Venture Seas of Death, Beirut, 1970.

A Circle in The Light, A Circle in The Dark, Baghdad, 1975.

Joseph’s Brothers, Baghdad, 1979.

Fallouts, Baghdad, 1982.

Father Says We’ll Help Him, Baghdad, 1986.

Jadara, 1997.

Diaspora, Beirut, 200.

== Death ==
Al Zahawi suffered from an illness at the end of her life and became paralyzed. She was staying in Al Karama Teaching Hospital, where she died on 13 February 2015. She was buried in Shuhadaa Al-Adhamiyah cemetery.

== See also ==
- Nazik Al-Malaika
- Amira Nur al-Din
- Wafaa Abed Al Razzaq
