= Fatina al-Na'ib =

Fatina al-Na'ib (1917 – 1993) was an Iraqi poet and educator.

She was born in Baghdad and graduated from the Primary Teachers' Institute in 1937. She went on to study English at the College of Queen 'Aliya in Baghdad. She taught secondary school and also worked in education management. Her poetry was broadcast on the radio and her poems also appeared in the local press.

== Selected poetry compendiums ==
- Lahib al-ruh ("The Spirit's Blaze"), 1955
- Rimin al-quyud ("The Clang of the Fetters"), 1962
- Rasis al-hubb ("Love's Patina"), 1977
