= Issam al-Said =

Iraqi painter, print-maker, designer, etcher, architect, philosopher and author

- Born: September 7, 1938; Baghdad, Iraq
- Died: 26 December 1988 (aged 50); London, England
- Education: Cambridge University, (1961); Hammersmith College of Art and Design. London (1962-64); University of Newcastle-upon-Tyne (1988)
- Known for: Painter, print-maker, designer, etcher, architect, philosopher and author
- Notable work: Central Mosque, London, 1976-77; Islamic Cultural Centre, London, 1976-77; Aloussi Mosque, Baghdad, 1982-83; Al-Aboud Mosque, Baghdad, 1984
- Website: Al-Said Official website

Issam al-Said (7 September 1938-26 December 1988) was a distinguished Iraqi painter, print-maker, designer, etcher, architect, philosopher and author who completed several major public buildings in Baghdad and in London.

== Life and career ==
Issam al-Said was born in Baghdad in 1938 into an influential family. He was the second son of Iraqi parents, Sabah Nuri al-Said and Esmat Ali Pasha Fahmi (who was of Egyptian ancestry) and the grandson of Nuri al-Said Pasha (Iraq's Prime Minister, 1930–58). As an adult, his older brother, Falah, was the personal pilot to King Hussein. Both his father and grand-father were brutally killed during the 1958 revolution.

He studied architecture at Cambridge University, graduating in 1961 and also studied at the Hammersmith College of Art and Design, London in 1962-4. He began preparing for a PhD on the Methodology of Geometric Proportioning in Islamic Architecture at the University of Newcastle-upon-Tyne in 1988, but died on Boxing Day 1988 in London of a heart attack. He was buried on 1 January 1989. before he could complete it. The work was published posthumously.

== Work ==
He was a versatile artist who, in addition to major public buildings completed in London and Baghdad, also designed furniture including lamps, carpets, tiles, furniture, etc. From the 1960s, he began incorporating kufi script into his artworks, thereby joining the growing ranks of hurufiyya artists developing this style in the Middle East and North Africa in the 1950s and 60s.

His artworks are held in international collections, both private and public, including prestigious art museums such as: The British Museum, Victoria and Albert Museum (London), Museum of Modern Art (MOMA), New York; National Museum of Modern Art (Baghdad), the National Museum of Modern Art (Amman, Jordan) and Darat al Funun - The Khalid Shoman Foundation (Amman, Jordan).

=== Select list of architectural works ===
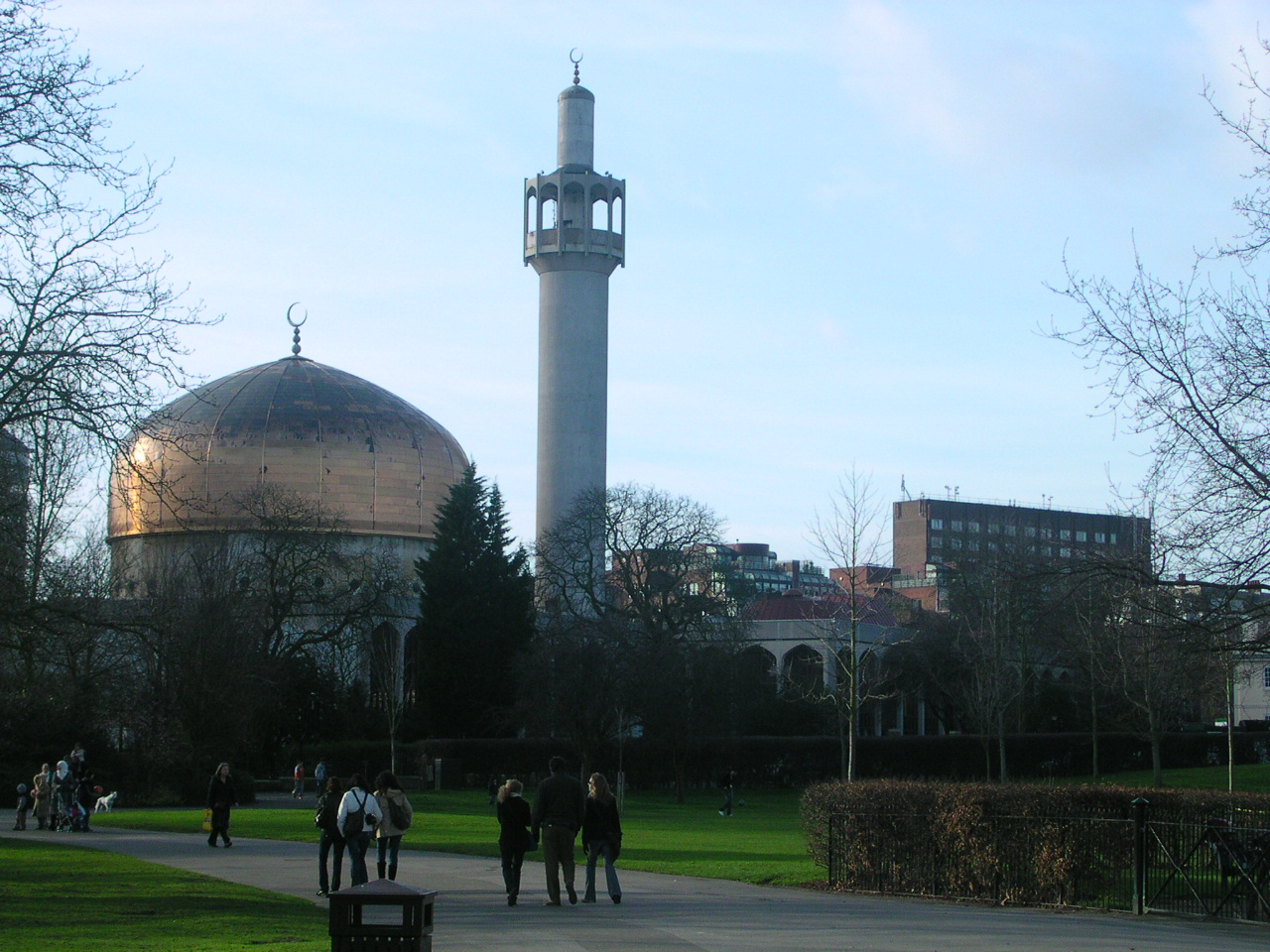
London Central Mosque designed by Issam al-Said, 1976-77

- Central Mosque, London, 1976-77
- Islamic Cultural Centre, London, 1976–77
- Aloussi Mosque, Baghdad, 1982–83
- Al-Aboud Mosque, Baghdad, 1984

=== Select list of paintings ===
- Head of Christ, watercolour, pen, ink & oil on paper on board, 25x16cm, c. 1959
- Sodom and Gomorrah, 1962
- Medinat al Hub, Oil on canvas 102x153cm 1963 (Inspired by Nazik Al-Malaika's poem Medinat al-Hub)
- Geometric Multiples, enamel on aluminium, 1979
- At the Door, made of prints, 1979
- Wa la Ghaliba illa Allah, 1962-1974
- Allah al-Kalima , Mixed media and oil on canvas, 50x50cm, 196
- Kufic IV, date unknown
- Three Women, aquatinta etching, date unknown

=== Publications ===
- Islamic Art and Architecture: The System of Geometric Design, 1993 (published posthumously and based on his PhD dissertation)
- Geometric Concepts in Islamic Art,World of Islam Festival, London, 1976 (co-authored with A. Parman)

== Legacy ==
He is the subject of the book, Issam El-Said: Artist and Scholar by Samir Chorbachi Published by Issam El-Said Foundation, 1989 (two editions in English and Arabic)

== See also ==
- Iraqi art
- List of Iraqi artists
- List of mosques in Iraq
