= Bahira Abdulatif =

Iraqi-Spanish poet and translator

- باهرة محمد عبد اللطيف
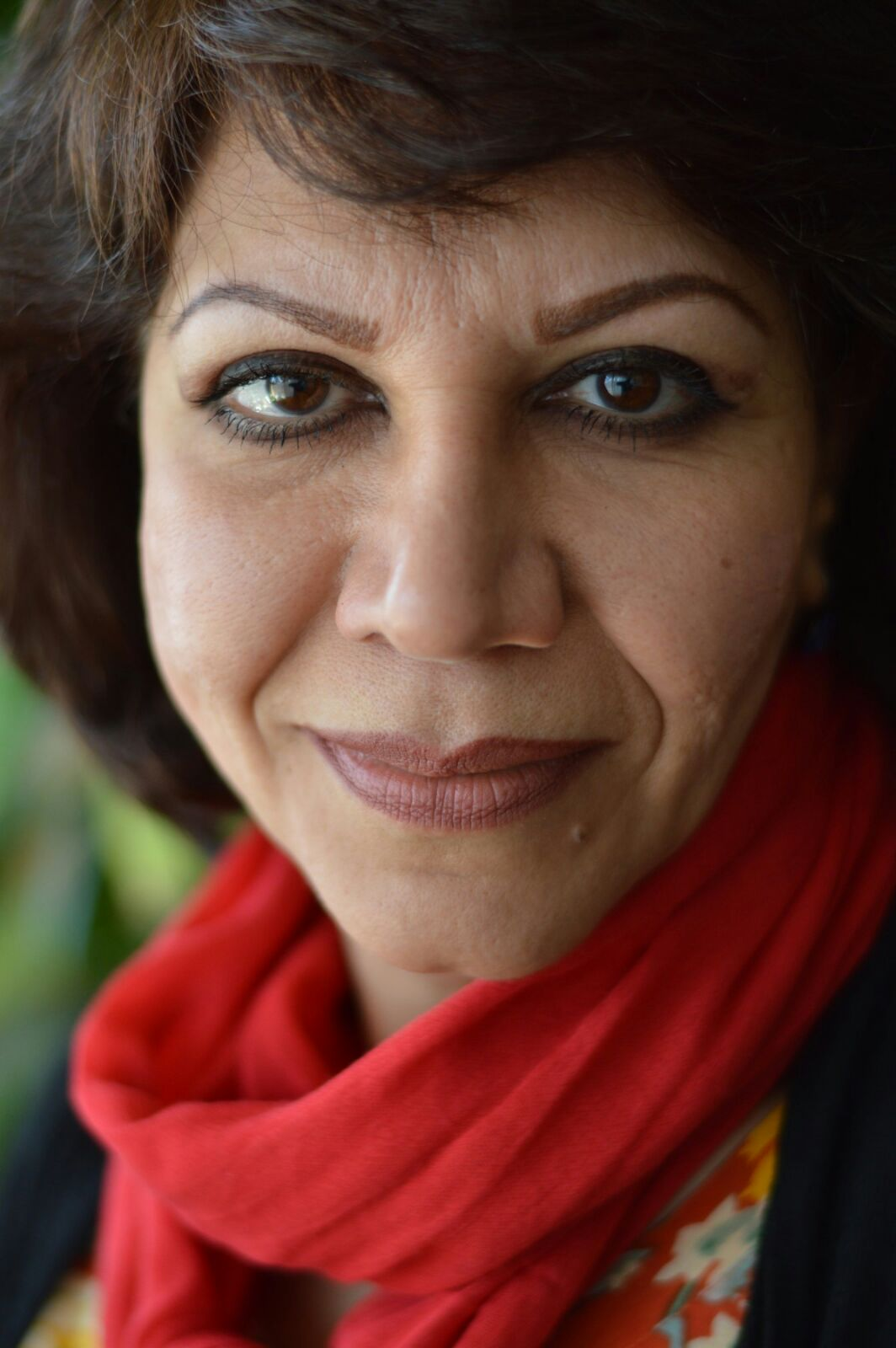
- Occupations: Writer, translator, professor

Bahira Abdulatif Yasin (Arabic: باهرة محمد عبد اللطيف) is an Iraqi writer, translator and professor living in Madrid.

She's an associate professor at Autonomous University of Madrid's Arabic and Islamic Studies department. An expert in Spanish philology, Abdulatif has also served in the Faculty of Languages at the University of Baghdad. She came to Madrid after United Nations imposed Sanctions against Iraq following its invasion of Kuwait in 1990. She has also taught at Complutense University of Madrid, University of Salamanca and written fictional works in Arabic.

Abdulatif won an award for her translation of Rafael Alberti's works in the Arabic language beside those of Jorge Luis Borges, José Carlos Mainer and José Antonio Maravall. She has also translated Cuerpo adentro, Ana Silva's first collection of poems into Arabic. In 2003, ?Lapidación? : mujer árabe, Islam y sociedad, a book she co-authored was published.

Abdulatif feels that before the US-led 2003 Invasion of Iraq, the country was more secular and among the Arab nations had "one of the most advanced legislation".
