= American Bar (Vienna) =

Cocktail bar in Austria

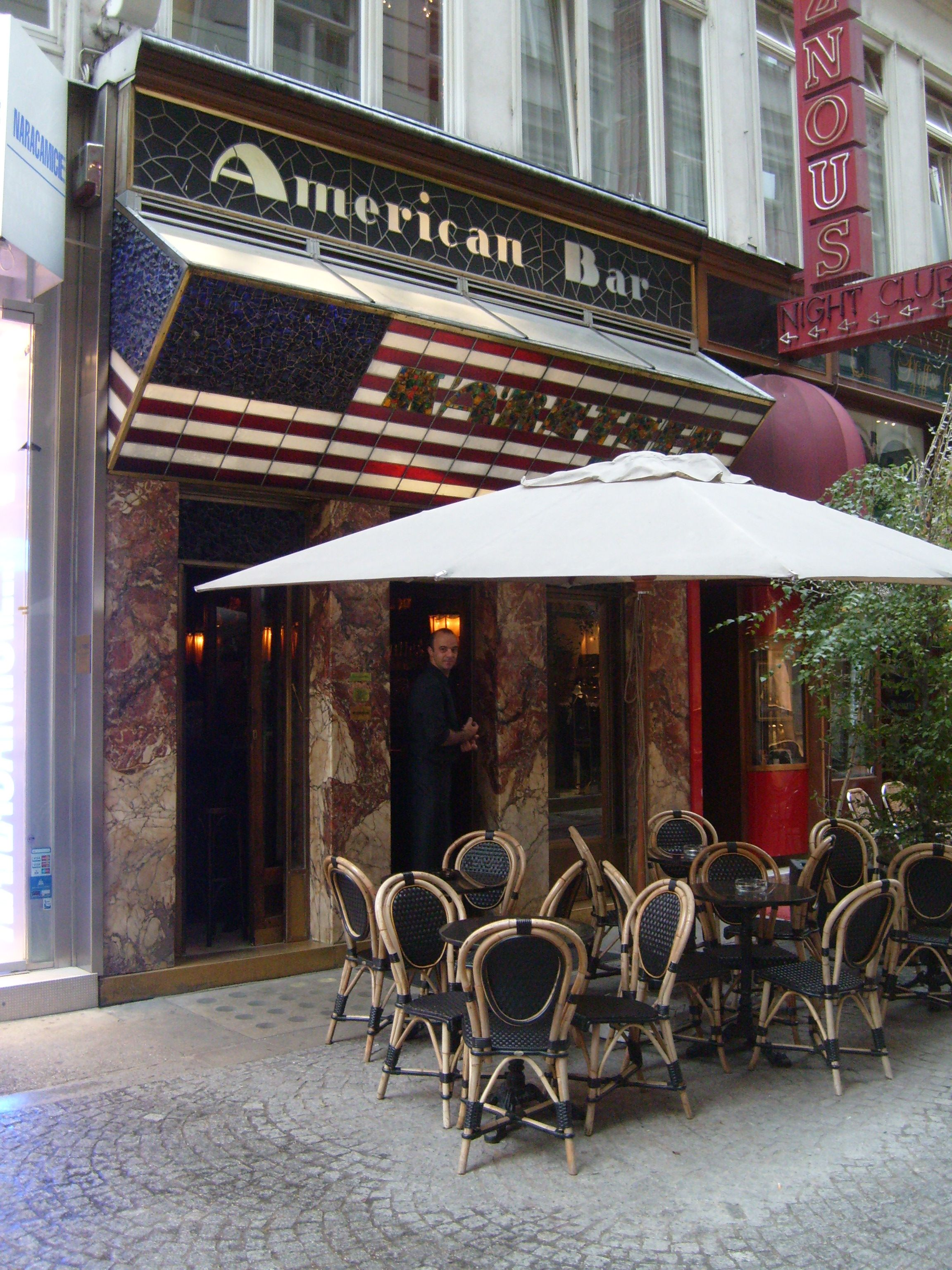
- View from Kartnerstrasse

- Location within Vienna
- Alternative names: Loosbar

General information
- Location: Innere Stadt, Vienna, Austria, Loos American Bar, Kärntner Durchgang 10, 1010 Wien, Austria
- Coordinates: 48°12′28″N 16°22′16″E
- Year built: 1908

Technical details
- Floor area: 280 sq ft

Design and construction
- Architect: Adolf Loos

The American Bar is an American style cocktail bar located in downtown Vienna. Frequented by many significant historical figures, the marble and mahogany clad bar was designed in 1907 by architect Adolf Loos to challenge traditional cultural ideas about how we should decorate our buildings. Today, the smallest bar in Vienna receives avid attendance, and has recently been the subject of several recreations, and even a museum exhibition in LA.

== Appearance ==
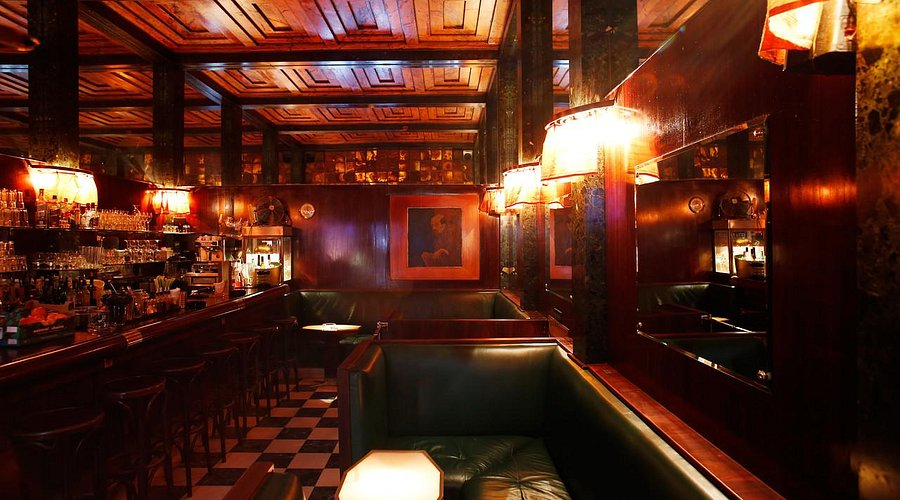
Interior View

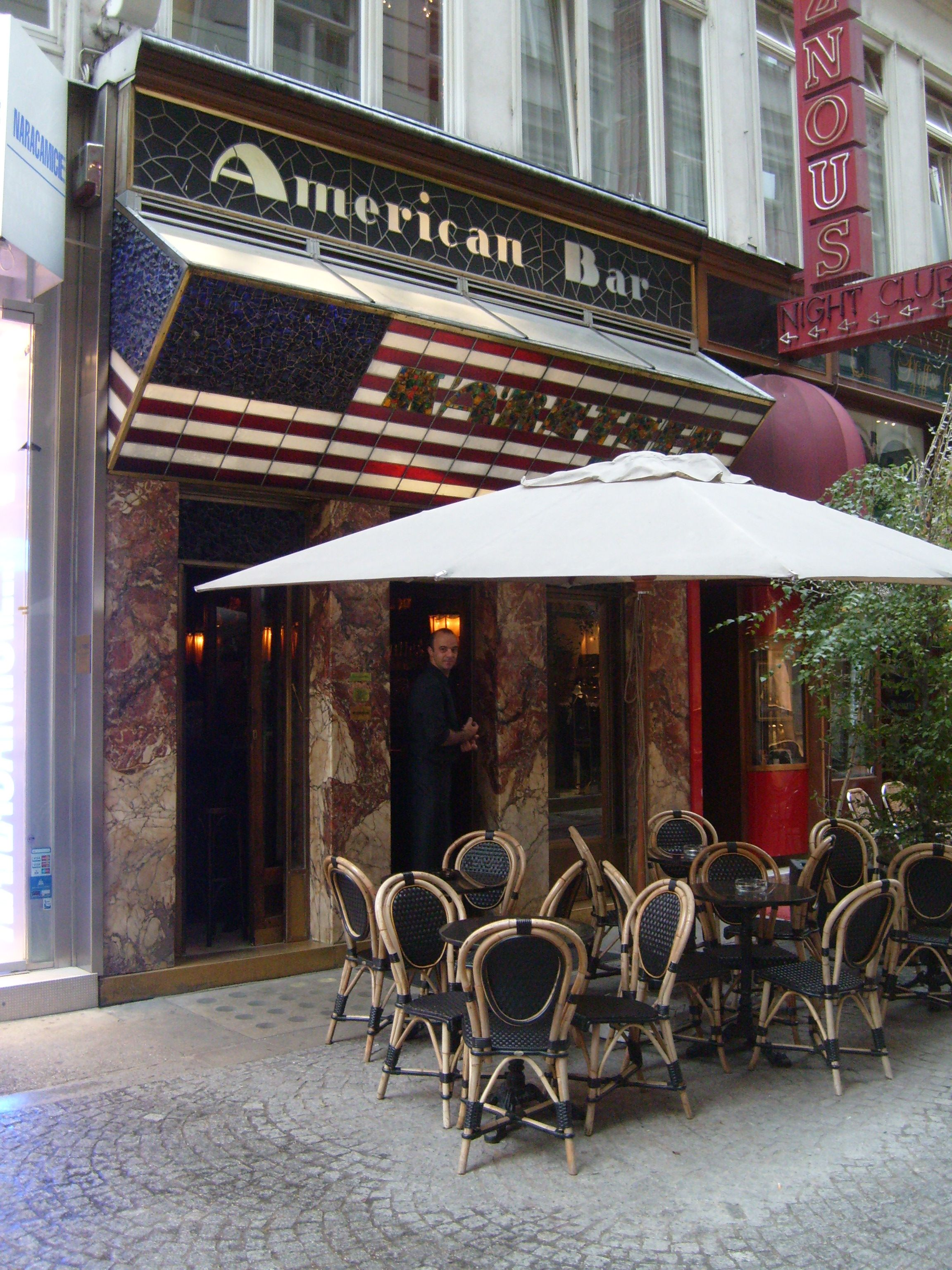
Exterior View

From the street, an illuminated mosaic of the American flag that takes up the width of the whole building angles over the sidewalk, crowned with a mosaic of its name in onyx and marble that is equally as wide. This is supported by 4 green marble columns that frame full height windows and its entrance.

The bar's interior is notable for its intricate materials that make its 290 square foot layout feel more cozy than cramped. The bottom half of the wall is covered with mahogany, while the top half is encompassed by mirrors that continue the linear geometry of the room and creates a feeling of expansiveness. Above the entry, sunlight from the street seeps in through tiles of onyx, which are mirrored by green and white marble tiles on the ground, and coffered marble ceilings. A mahogany bar with gold fixtures takes up the left side of the roof and three low green leather booths line the walls on the right. There is a basement and cellar area, but little documentation exists on this area.

Notably, the bar does not have any embellishment or ornamentation, except for a portrait of esteemed poet Peter Altenberg by Gustav Jagerspacher over the booth where he used to sit. All of the materials remain in their original state, unaltered by color or dye, and without physical embellishment.

== Origin ==
Four years after completing the bar, Adolf Loos published an essay on "ornamentation and crime". Loos argued that cultural progress was linked to the removal of ornamentation from everyday objects, stating that "the evolution of culture is synonymous with the removal of ornamentation from objects of everyday use." He contended that requiring craftsmen or builders to devote time to ornamentation was wasteful, as it accelerated an object's obsolescence. His advocacy for unembellished design influenced the minimal massing characteristic of modern architecture, though his views also generated significant controversy for views of unilinear cultural evolution. Loos's argument about ornamentation and cultural progress echoes this kind of thinking, as it implies a singular trajectory where the elimination of ornament is an inevitable sign of advancement. However, the distinction is not between complicated and simple, but between purposeful, "organic" decoration, such as that created by indigenous cultures (Loos mentions African textiles and Persian rugs), and superfluous decoration. Leading scholarly debate suggests that it is likely Loos developed the ideas central to this theory while working on the American bar and similar works during this time.

== History and operations ==
Not much research has been done on the original financiers or owners of the work, but the bar was part of a movement that first introduced Viennese nightlife to American-style cocktail bars and British gentlemen's clubs. Opening in 1908, it is credited as the first cocktail bar in Vienna. Originally, this bar was exclusive to male visitors, but this changed just five weeks after the opening. As Claire Loos, Adolf Loos' wife, describes in her memoirs: "The women forced their way in." The bar closed down in WWI and WWII, but when the city began to rebuild, a band of young musicians briefly were allowed to establish a club (called the Straw Trunk) in the cellar.During this period, Jean Cocteau, Benjamin Britten, Orson Welles, Peter Altenberg and Cab Calloway were all notable patrons of this bar. Under the new management of Marianne Kohn since 1995, the bar has flourished.

== Recreations ==
Modern recreations of Adolf Loos's American Bar underscore the enduring impact of his modernist vision while adapting its form and function to diverse contemporary contexts.

- In New York, an operational pop-up—often referred to as "Bar Non-Lieu"—has been installed at the Austrian Cultural Forum. This recreation replicates key spatial and material qualities of Loos's original 1908 design, using mirrored surfaces, precise geometric proportions, and a curated cocktail menu to evoke the intimate ambience of the Viennese bar.
- In Los Angeles, a museum-style installation known as "Los Bar" reinterprets Loos's design through a DIY lens. Constructed almost entirely from repurposed materials such as MDF and cardboard, the project transforms the original's refined minimalism into a "social sculpture" that emphasizes performative interaction and resourceful reimagination of space.
- At Trinity College Dublin, a nearly exact replica of Loos's American Bar has been incorporated into the senior common room. Designed by de Blacam and Meagher in 1984 following extensive fire damage, this institutional recreation—accessible only to senior staff and scholars—preserves the essential elements of Loos's design, including its muted lighting, reflective surfaces, and minimalist finishes, thereby serving as both an homage to modernist principles and a distinctive campus landmark.
- The bar was the site of a 2013 Gucci commercial.
