= Wafaa Abed Al Razzaq =

Iraqi poet and writer

Wafaa Abed Al Razzaq (Arabic: وفاء عبد الرزاق) is an Iraqi poet and writer. She was born in 1952 in Basra, Iraq. She currently resides in London, UK, and holds a bachelor's degree in accounting.

== Awards ==
- Mitropolite Nicholaous No'man Prize of Human Virtues, for the script entitled From the War Child's Diary – 2008
- The Golden Anka’a Medal of literary Creation – The International Golden Anka’a Festival – 2008

== Contributions ==
Wafaa Abed Al Razzaq has participated in a number of poetry festivals and in the foundation of:

- The White Palm Tree Gallery – Iraq
- The White Palm Tree House for custody and re-qualifying street children in Iraq

== Memberships ==
- Ambassador of Iraqi Orphan Children in Iraq – London
- Supervisor for broad follow-up - International Golden Al–Anqa’a Touring Festival
- Foundation member at the Hope messenger Association - London
- Iraqi Writers Union – Iraq
- Exiled Writers Ink – London, UK
- Poets Around the World Movement – Chile
- Iraqi Association, member of the administration committee, head of the cultural committee – auditor of Iraqi association newspaper (AL Muntada) – London, UK
- Arabic Union for Internet Writers
- Syrian Story Friends Association – Syria
- Poetas del Mundo
- In addition to many other associations and organizations

== Publications ==
- Seven poetry books in traditional Arabic language, published between 1999 and 2008, in Lebanon, Jordan and Iraq.
- Seven poetry books in Iraqi spoken language published between 1996 and 1999, in Abu Dhabi and Jordan.
- Six poetry CD's in Iraqi spoken language – poetry reading accompanied by music
- Two short story books, published in 2000, Al-Kindi editor, Jordan
- Three novels published between 2000 and 2001, Al-Kindi editor, Jordan
- One poetic novel published in 2001, Al-Kindi editor, Jordan

=== Translation ===
From the War Child's Diary, translated from Arabic to French by Hédia DRIDI, co-revised by Josyane De Jesus-Bergey and Mohamed Rafrafi and published by L'Harmattan Edition, Paris, December 2008, with the title: Mémoires de l'enfant de la guerre – Ne volez pas ma voix.

=== Currently under publication ===
From the War Child's Diary: a poetry book that carries a message against war and calls for world peace. The book is currently under production for an 80-minute film against war.

- Wafaa Abed Al Razzaq has been published in several Arabic-language magazines and newspapers
- Some of her poems have been translated into English, French, Italian, Spanish, Turkish and Persian.

== See also ==
- Iraqi art
- Amal Al Zahawi
