= University of Basrah =

Public university in Iraq

Coordinates: 30.568°N 47.749°E

- Motto: وَقُل رَّبِّ زِدْنِي عِلْمًا "And say: My Lord! Increase me in knowledge." (20:114)
- Type: Public university
- Established: 1964
- President: Prof. Dr. Mohanad Jawad Kadhim AL-Asadi
- Administrative staff: 4,631
- Undergraduates: 99,751
- Location: Basra, Iraq
- Campus: Urban
- Website: www.uobasrah.edu.iq

The University of Basrah (Arabic: جامعة البصرة Jāmi'at Al Basrah) is a public university situated in the city of Basra, Iraq.

Founded in 1964 to meet the needs of southern Iraq, the University of Basrah was at first affiliated with the University of Baghdad, but in 1964 it became an independent body. Today the university consists of fourteen colleges located on three campuses around the city of Basra, with research facilities and student halls of residence. The University awards the degrees of BA, BSc, Higher Diploma, MA, MSc, MBBS and PhD.

== Colleges ==
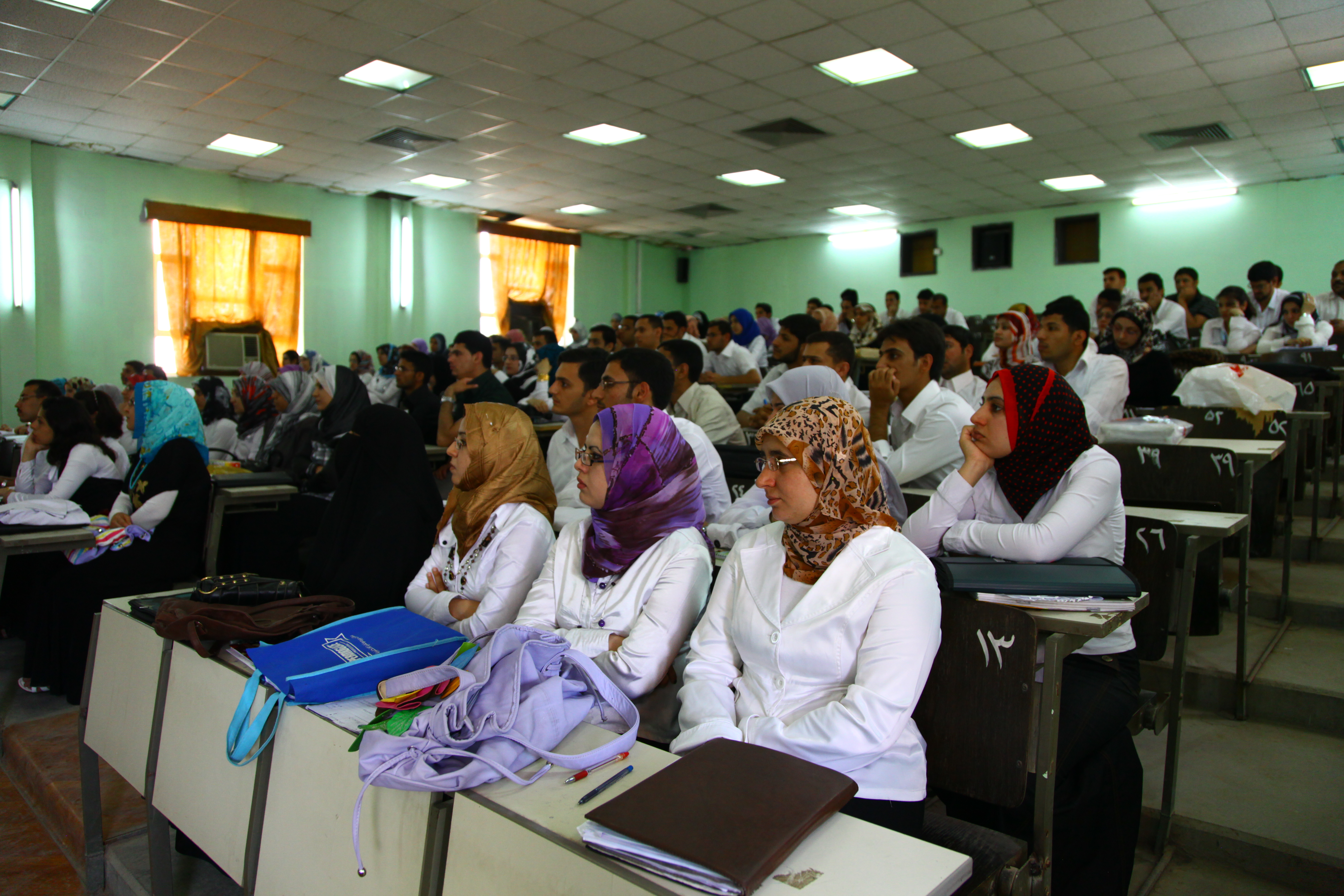
Iraqi medical students at Basra University College of Medicine (2010)

The university is composed of 22 colleges:

- College of Literature
- College of the Sciences
- College of Engineering
- College of Medicine
- College of Pharmacy
- College of Dentistry
- College of Nursing
- College of Agriculture
- College of Management and Economics
- College of Computer Science and Information Technology
- College of Law and Politics
- College of Physical Education
- College of Veterinary Medicine
- College of Fine Arts
- College of Education for Girls
- College of Education - Al-Qurna
- College of Education for Pure Sciences
- College of Education for Humanities
- College of Marine Sciences
- Al Zahraa College of Medicine
- Faculty of Management and Economics –Qurna
- College of Graduate Studies

== Centres ==
The University conducts research through the following research centres:

- Iranian Studies Centre
- Marine Science Centre
- Polymer Studies Centre
- Arabian Gulf Studies Centre
- Basrah Studies Centre
- Date Palm Research Centre
- Educational Counselling Centre
- Resources Centre
- Teaching Methods Development Centre
- Living Languages Centre
- Computer Centre
- Continuing Educational Centre

There is also the Desalination Unit (affiliated with the College of Engineering), the Natural History Museum, the Haemoglobinopathy Unit, the Internet Resources Centre, the Central Library, and a Publishing house.

== Campuses ==
The University of Basrah consists of a main headquarter located in Ashar and five campuses, they are as follows:

- Northern Campus of Qarmat Ali contains the colleges of Pharmacy, Veterinary Medicine, Engineering, Science, Education, Agriculture, Computer Science and information Technology and Physical Education.
- Southern Campus of Bab Al Zubayer contains the colleges of Business and Economics, Law, Arts, Historical Studies, Fine Arts.
- College of Medicine Campus contains the College of Medicine and the Teaching Hospital.
- College of Dentistry Campus contains the College of Dentistry.
- College of Edqucation Qurna Campus contains the College of Education.

== Presidents ==
1. Dr. Abdel Hadi Mahbooba (01/04/1964 to 24/10/1968)
2. Dr. Sadeq Al-Khayyat (from 25/10/1968 to 03/10/1969)
3. Dr. Saad Abdul Baqi Al Rawi(from 04/10/1969 to 31/12/1969)
4. Dr. Khalil Hamid Al Talib(from 01/01/1970 to 04/04/1970)
5. Dr. Nizar Nadheef Al-Shawi (from 05/04/1970 to 05/09/1975)
6. Dr. Yousef Abdul Illah Khashab (from 05/09/1975 to 05/12/1984)
7. Dr. Majeed Mohammed Saeed (from 06/12/1984 to 21/03/1985)
8. Dr. Dakhil Hassan Jrew (from 21/03/1985 to 05/02/1993)
9. Dr. Akram Mohammed Sobhi (from 06/02/1993 to 30/08/2001)
10. Dr. Mohammed Abdul Al Al Nuaimi (from 01/09/2001 to 09/04/2003)
11. Dr. Salman Dawood Salman (from 01/05/2003 to 11/09/2005)
12. Dr. As'ad Saleem Abdulqadir (from 01/07/2004 to 1/09/2004)
13. Dr. Ali Abbass Alwan (from 11/09/2005 to 29/10/2009)
14. Dr. Salih Ismail Najim (from 01/11/2009 until 26/6/2012)
15. Prof. Thamer Ahmad Hamdan Al-Tamimi (from 27/6/2012)
16. Prof. Dr. Saad Shaheen Hamadi (from 1/7/2019 until 23/1/2024)
17. Prof. Dr. Mohanad Jawad Kadhim AL-Asadi (from 23/1/2024 until now)

== See also ==
- List of Islamic educational institutions
- List of universities in Iraq
- Faculty of University of Basrah
