= List of Iraqi Americans =

This is a list of notable Iraqi Americans, including both original immigrants who obtained American citizenship and their American descendants.

== Academia/science ==
- Elias Alsabti, plagiarist medical researcher and Pennsylvania medical licensed
- Sinan Antoon, academic, writer, filmmaker
- Hind Rassam Culhane, professor
- Rafil A. Dhafir, physician
- Mona Hanna-Attisha, pediatrician, professor, Flint Water Crisis whistleblower and public health advocate
- Khidir Hamza, scientist and fraudulent
- Emanuel Kamber, physics professor at Western Michigan University
- Abraham Karem, designer of fixed and rotary-wing unmanned aircraft, regarded as the founding father of drone technology
- Majid Khadduri, academic and founder of the Paul H. Nitze School of Advanced International Studies Middle East Studies program
- Jessica Meir, NASA astronaut, marine biologist, and physiologist
- Thomas L. Saaty, Assyrian-Iraqi professor at the University of Pittsburgh
- Nada Shabout, art historian and Assistant Professor at the University of North Texas
- Ella Shohat, professor, author and activist
- Saadi Simawe, translator, novelist and teacher
- Donny George Youkhanna, archaeologist, anthropologist, author, curator, and scholar, and visiting professor at Stony Brook University in New York

== Activists ==
- Faisal Saeed Al Mutar, human rights activist and social entrepreneur
- Amir Ashour, LGBT rights activist

== Actors ==
- Yasmine Hanani, actress known for her role in Voices of Iraq and The Kingdom
- Nicholas Kadi, actor
- Chris Kattan, comedian and actor; best known for his work on Saturday Night Live; paternal grandfather was of Iraqi Jewish descent
- Jemima Kirke, artist, actress and director
- Lola Kirke, actress and singer-songwriter
- Michael Nouri, actor; father is from Iraq
- Heather Raffo, award-winning playwright/actress most known for her role in 9 Parts of Desire
- Basam Ridha, actor
- Alia Shawkat, actress known as Maeby Fünke on Arrested Development, father is from Iraq

== Architecture ==
- Hisham N. Ashkouri, architect

== Artists ==
- M. J. Alhabeeb, calligrapher
- Sama Raena Alshaibi, artist
- Halla Ayla, artist
- Zigi Ben-Haim, painter and sculptor
- Wafaa Bilal, artist and professor at the School of the Art Institute of Chicago
- Hayv Kahraman, artist/painter
- Toba Khedoori, artist

== Business ==
- Efrem Harkham, hotelier and philanthropist
- David Hindawi, software entrepreneur, co-founder of cybersecurity firm Tanium
- Huda Kattan, CEO of Huda Beauty
- Shakir al Khafaji, businessman
- Moishe Mana, businessman and real estate developer
- Selim Zilkha, entrepreneur
- Alina Habba, Donald Trump's personal attorney

== Comedians ==
- Brian Awadis, also known as FaZe Rug
- Paul Elia, Assyrian American comedian
- Remy Munasifi, also known as GoRemy

== Directors ==
- Usama Alshaibi, filmmaker
- Carole Basri, filmmaker
- Ali Hossaini, filmmaker, philosopher and pacifist
- Anisa Mehdi, Emmy Award-winning film director and journalist

== Military ==
- Ahmed Qusai al-Taayie, soldier
- Ahmed K. Altaie, Specialist in the United States Army, killed in Iraq

== Models ==
- Amy Fadhli, fitness model, actress and winner of the Fitness America National Champion 1996

== Musicians ==
- Hanan Alattar, soprano opera singer
- Rahim AlHaj, musician and composer
- Ahmed El Faleh, singer who participated in Super Star 3, the pan-Arabic version of Pop Idol
- Amir ElSaffar, musician and younger brother of Dena
- Sargon Gabriel, Assyrian singer
- Juliana Jendo, Assyrian singer
- Chemda Khalili, singer-songwriter and co-host of the Keith and The Girl podcast
- Stephan Said, musician, writer and political activist
- Ashur Bet Sargis, Assyrian singer
- Janan Sawa, Assyrian musician
- TIMZ, rapper

== Politics ==
- Rend al-Rahim Francke, politician, political activist and once held the position as Iraqi ambassador to the United States
- Ayham al-Samarie, politician
- Adam Benjamin, Jr., Assyrian-Iraqi, Indiana Congressman
- Wadie Deddeh, Assyrian assemblyman and California State Senator
- Anna Eshoo, Assyrian-Iraqi, California Congressman
- John Nimrod, Assyrian-Iraqi, Illinois Senator
- Murad Ismael, Iraqi Yazidi, member of Iraqi parliament, politician and activist
- Qubad Talabani, Kurdistan Regional Government (KRG) representative in Washington DC and son of Iraqi president Jalal Talabani

== Sports ==
- Alex Agase, Assyrian-American, American football (Gridiron) player
- Lou Agase, Assyrian-American, American football (Gridiron) player
- Najah Ali, boxer
- Steven Beitashour, Assyrian who played in Major League Soccer
- Falah Hassan, footballer
- Justin Meram, Assyrian U.S. based soccer player
- Michael Shabaz, Assyrian American tennis player

== Writers and journalists ==
- Lorraine Ali, reporter, editor, culture writer and music critic for Newsweek
- Ibrahim al-Marashi, academic plagiarized by the British government
- Alise Alousi, poet
- Sinan Antoon, poet, novelist and translator
- Leila Barclay, American journalist and storyteller
- Alon Ben-Meir, professor, writer and is the Middle East Project director at the World Policy Institute
- Sargon Boulus, Assyrian-Iraqi
- Abdul Ameer Yousef Habeeb, journalist
- Jack Marshall (author), poet and author
- Dunya Mikhail, poet
- Armand Nassery, author and filmmaker
- Greg Patent, author (born in Hong Kong to a Russian father and Iraqi mother)
- Daniel Pearl, journalist (kidnapped and murdered in Pakistan)
- Ayad Rahim, journalist
- Mahmoud Saeed, Iraqi novelist
- Zainab Salbi, writer, activist, co-founder and president of Women for Women International
- Cindy Sargon, Assyrian-Iraqi TV chef
- Anita Sarkeesian, Canadian-American feminist media critic and public speaker. Her parents are Armenians from Iraq who emigrated to Canada in the 1970s
- Rachel Wahba, writer
- Thura Al Windawi, author
- Obelit Yadgar, Assyrian-Iraqi-Radio Glendale, Wisconsin

== Other ==
- Husham Al-Husainy, Sheikh of the Karbala Islamic Education Center
- Noor Almaleki, honor killing victim
- Hassan Al-Qazwini, religious leader
- Mohammed Odeh al-Rehaief, attorney who helped the United States armed forces rescue Jessica Lynch from Iraq
- Aban Elias, civil engineer (held hostage and has not been heard from)
- Samir Gegea, Iraqi interpreter who captured Saddam Hussein
- Jumana Hanna, involved in war propaganda
- Farris Hassan
- Steven Menashi, lawyer who serves as a US judge of the US Court of Appeals for the Second Circuit
- Michael Mizrachi, professional poker player (Iraqi Jewish father)
- Robert Mizrachi, professional poker player and older brother of Michael Mizrachi
- Mohammad Munaf, terrorist
- Samuel Nalo, businessman, hijacker, burglar, and brother of Robert
- Nadya Suleman, gave birth to octuplets in January 2008
- Abdul Rahman Yasin, suspected terrorist

== See also ==
- Iraqi Americans
- List of Iraqis
