= CIA transnational anti-crime and anti-drug activities =

CIA crime

This article deals with activities of the U.S. Central Intelligence Agency related to transnational crime, including the illicit drug trade.

Two offices of the CIA Directorate of Intelligence have analytical responsibilities in this area. The Office of Transnational Issues applies unique functional expertise to assess existing and emerging US national security threats. It provides the most senior US policymakers, military planners, and law enforcement with analysis, warning, and crisis support.

The CIA Crime and Narcotics Center researches information on international narcotics trafficking and organized crime for policymakers and the law enforcement community. Since the CIA has no domestic police authority, it sends its analytic information to the Federal Bureau of Investigation (FBI) and other law enforcement organizations, such as the Drug Enforcement Administration (DEA) and the Office of Foreign Assets Control of the United States Department of the Treasury (OFAC).

Another part of the CIA, the National Clandestine Service, collects human intelligence (HUMINT) in these areas.

== Drug trade ==
According to the United Nations Office on Drugs and Crime (UNODOC),

Drug cultivation thrives on instability, corruption and poor governance. The world's biggest drug producing centres are in regions beyond the control of the central government, like South Afghanistan, South-West Colombia and East Myanmar. Until government control, democracy and the rule of law are restored, these regions will remain nests of insurgency and drug production—and represent the biggest challenge to containment.

Especially in developing countries in conflict, there have been allegations that the CIA assisted the illicit drug activities of local leaders who saw that as a payment for their assistance.

=== Counternarcotics mission ===
CIA publishes reference materials in this area, such as "Heroin Movement Worldwide".

CIA supported a reevaluation of US antidrug priorities by the President's Office of National Drug Control Policy by publishing a paper that addressed the strategic vulnerabilities of the global drug trade. The paper addressed the exploitable operational, logistical, financial, and geographic weakness of the many criminal enterprises that supply narcotics to the United States and other markets. The paper was well received by the Director of the Office of National Drug Control Policy, and he instructed the law enforcement community to use it as a template to craft a companion product addressing the vulnerabilities of the US domestic drug trade.

CIA analysts wrote the first-ever analysis of drug flows and consumption in Brazil, the world's second-largest consumer of cocaine after the United States. The study entailed open-source field collection and an innovative methodology for calculating the prevalence of drug use.

=== Latin America ===
There have been allegations that CIA was involved in the Latin American drug trade, possibly to finance operations in Nicaragua and other areas around the world where Congress had denied funding, such as Afghanistan during the Soviet invasion, and in Southeast Asia during the Vietnam War. According to a personal account by Everett Ellis Briggs, former U.S. Ambassador to Panama and Honduras, CIA undermined efforts to put a stop to the drug smuggling activities of Panamanian dictator Manuel Noriega prior to the December 1989 U.S. invasion of Panama.

==== Iran-Contra related ====
Released on April 13, 1989, the Kerry Committee report found that the U.S. State Department had assisted drug traffickers:

who provided support for the Contras were involved in drug trafficking ... and elements of the Contras themselves knowingly received financial and material assistance from drug traffickers.

Some of these payments were after the traffickers had been indicted by federal law enforcement agencies on drug charges or while traffickers were under active investigation by these same agencies. The report declared, "It is clear that individuals who provided support for the Contras were involved in drug trafficking ... and elements of the Contras themselves knowingly received financial and material assistance from drug traffickers."

Representative Maxine Waters testified to Congress:

Senator Kerry and his Senate investigation found drug traffickers had used the Contra war and tie to the Contra leadership to help this trade. Among their findings, the Kerry committee investigators found that traffickers used the Contra supply networks and the traffickers provided support for Contras in return. The CIA created, trained, supported, and directed the Contras and were involved in every level of their war.

In 1996, investigative journalist Gary Webb wrote a series of articles for the San Jose Mercury News entitled, "Dark Alliance", in which he reported evidence that CIA aircraft, which had ferried arms to the Nicaraguan Contras, had been used to ship cocaine to the United States on their return flights. In 1998 the new DCI, George Tenet, declared that he was releasing the report. The report of CIA Inspector General Frederick Hitz and Hitz's testimony showed that the "CIA did not 'expeditiously' cut off relations with alleged drug traffickers" and "the CIA was aware of allegations that 'dozens of people and a number of companies connected in some fashion to the contra program' were involved in drug trafficking" Hitz also said that under an agreement in 1982 between Ronald Reagan's Attorney General William French Smith and the CIA, agency officers were not required to report allegations of drug trafficking involving non-employees, which was defined as meaning paid and non-paid "assets [meaning agents], pilots who ferried supplies to the contras, as well as contra officials and others. This agreement was revealed, at a time when there were allegations that the CIA was using drug dealers in its covert operation to bring down the leftist Sandinista government in Nicaragua. Only after Congressional funds were restored in 1986 was the agreement modified to require the CIA to stop paying agents whom it believed were involved in the drug trade.

Webb also alleged that Central American narcotics traffickers could distribute cocaine in U.S. cities in the 1980s without the interference of normal law enforcement agencies, and that the CIA intervened to prevent the prosecution of drug dealers who were helping to fund the Contras. The Mercury News ultimately retracted Webb's conclusions, and Webb was not authorized to conduct any further investigative reporting. Webb was transferred to cover non-controversial suburban stories and subsequently gave up journalism and committed suicide.

===== Nicaragua 1984 =====
In 1984, U.S. officials began receiving reports of Contra cocaine trafficking. Three officials told journalists that they considered these reports "reliable." Former Panamanian deputy health minister Dr. Hugo Spadafora, who had fought with the Contra army, outlined charges of cocaine trafficking to a prominent Panamanian official and was later found murdered. The charges linked the Contra trafficking to Sebastian Gonzalez Mendiola, who was charged with cocaine trafficking on November 26, 1984, in Costa Rica.

===== Nicaragua 1983 =====
On March 16, 1986, the San Francisco Examiner published a report on the "1983 seizure of 430 pounds of cocaine from a Colombian freighter" in San Francisco which indicated that a "cocaine ring in the San Francisco Bay area helped finance Nicaragua's Contra rebels." Carlos Cabezas, convicted of conspiracy to traffic cocaine, said that the profits from his crimes "belonged to ... the Contra revolution." He told the Examiner, "I just wanted to get the Communists out of my country." Julio Zavala, also convicted on trafficking charges, said "that he supplied $500,000 to two Costa Rican-based Contra groups and that the majority of it came from cocaine trafficking in the San Francisco Bay area, Miami and New Orleans."

Former CIA official David MacMichael explained the inherent relationship between CIA activity in Latin America and drug trafficking:

Once you set up a covert operation to supply arms and money, it's very difficult to separate it from the kind of people who are involved in other forms of trade, and especially drugs. There is a limited number of planes, pilots and landing strips. By developing a system for supply of the Contras, the US built a road for drug supply into the US.

==== 1990 Colombian counternarcotics blowback ====
In November 1996, shortly after then-CIA Director John Deutsch went to Los Angeles to refute allegations raised by the Gary Webb investigative report on cocaine trafficking and the CIA, a Miami jury indicted Venezuelan CIA asset, General Ramon Guillen Davila, who "led a CIA counter-narcotics program that put a ton of cocaine on U.S. streets in 1990." The New York Times reported:

The CIA—over the objections of the Drug Enforcement Administration, a branch of the Justice Department—approved the shipment of at least one ton of nearly pure cocaine to Miami International Airport as a way of gathering information about the Colombian drug cartels. But the cocaine ended up on the street because of "poor judgment and management on the part of several CIA officers," the intelligence agency said.

=== Southeast Asia ===
Alfred McCoy, author of The Politics of Heroin in Southeast Asia, described CIA complicity in the Vietnam-era drug trade originating in Southeast Asia, and further described CIA attempts to interfere with publication of the book.

On June 1 of this year an official of the US Central Intelligence Agency paid a visit to the New York offices of my publisher, Harper and Row, Inc. This CIA official was Mr. Cord Meyer, Jr. (now the CIA's Assistant Deputy Director of Plans; formerly the CIA official in charge of providing covert financial subsidies for organizations such as the National Student Association, Encounter Magazine, and the Congress for Cultural Freedom). Mr. Meyer urged several of his old friends among Harper and Row's senior management to provide him with a copy of the galley proofs of my history of the international narcotics traffic, The Politics of Heroin in Southeast Asia. In this book I show the complicity of various US agencies—particularly the CIA and the State Department—in organizing the Southeast Asian drug traffic since the early 1950s.

According to Dr. McCoy, the agency intimidated his sources and tried to keep the book from being published. There is also an article in Peace Magazine containing similar allegations. The Mel Gibson film, Air America, was based on the Christopher Robbins book Air America, which chronicled the history of CIA proprietary airlines in Southeast Asia.

In his book, McCoy wrote

It is transported in the planes, vehicles, and other conveyances supplied by the United States. The profit from the trade has been going into the pockets of some of our best friends in Southeast Asia. The charge concludes with the statement that the traffic is being carried on with the indifference if not the closed-eye compliance of some American officials and there is no likelihood of its being shut down in the foreseeable future."

This is not inconsistent with Leary's description (with respect to Laos and in Southeast Asia), although there seem to be differences in the degree of knowledge and consent by CIA management.

==== Beginning of transnational drug trade in colonial Indochina ====
McCoy asserts that the French administration of Indochina had financed its covert operations with the drug trade, and the CIA had simply replaced the French, to finance similar operations. He said he had gone to Paris and interviewed retired general Maurice Belleux, the former head of the French equivalent of the CIA, an organization called Service de Documentation Extérieure et de Contre-Espionnage (SDECE, predecessor of the current French service, the Direction générale de la sécurité extérieure).

In an amazing interview he told me that French military intelligence had financed all their covert operations from the control of the Indochina drug trade ... The French paratroopers fighting with hill tribes collected the opium and French aircraft would fly the opium down to Saigon and the Sino-Vietnamese mafia that was the instrument of French intelligence would then distribute the opium. The central bank accounts, the sharing of the profits, was all controlled by French military intelligence. He concluded the interview by telling me that it was his information that the CIA had taken over the French assets and were pursuing something of the same policy. So I went to Southeast Asia to follow up on that lead and that's what took me into doing this whole book. It was basically pulling a thread and keep tucking at it and a veil masking the reality began to unravel.

Since the 1920s the League of Nations, the forerunner of the United Nations, and the United States have prohibited opium and cocaine products from legal sale. These products had already emerged as vast global commodities with very substantial production zones and large markets, large demand for those commodities both in the third world and the first. The historic Asia opium zone stretches across 5,000 miles of Asian mainland from Turkey to Laos along the southern borders of the Soviet Union and the southern border of communist China. It just so happened that one of the key war zones in the cold war happened to lay astride the Asian opium zone.

==== Perspective on CIA role ====
During the 40 years of the cold war, from the late 1940s to this year, the CIA pursued a policy that I call radical pragmatism. Their mission was to stop communism and in pursuit of that mission they would ally with anyone and do anything to fight communism.

McCoy does not so much accuse the CIA of direct participation in the drug trade, than protecting the drug trade of people the CIA believed essential allies in its primary mission.

During the long years of the cold war the CIA mounted major covert guerilla operations along the Soviet-Chinese border. The CIA recruited as allies people we now call drug lords for their operation against communist China in northeastern Burma in 1950, then from 1965 to 1975 [during the Vietnam war] their operation in northern Laos and throughout the decade of the 1980s, the Afghan operation against Soviet forces in Afghanistan.

Powerful, upland political figures control the societies and economies in these regions and part of that panoply of power is the opium trade. The CIA extended the mantle of their alliance to these drug lords and in every case the drug lords used it to expand a small local trade in opium into a major source of supply for the world markets and the United States.

While they were allied with the United States these drug lords were absolutely immune to any kind of investigation. If you're involved in any kind of illicit commodity trade, organized crime activity like drug trafficking, there is only one requisite for success, immunity, and the CIA gave them that. As long as they were allied with the CIA, the local police and then the DEA stayed away from the drug lords.

UNODOC observes

Southeast Asia is closing a tragic chapter that has blighted the Golden Triangle for decades—the region is now almost opium free. Yet it is not free of poverty and therefore farmers remain vulnerable to the temptations of illicit incomes. Much more assistance—for alternative crops and also for viable income substitution—is needed to ensure that drug-free development is sustained in the greater Mekong basin.

It may well be that US aid, perhaps not from the CIA but from the Agency for International Development, will be needed create these alternatives. This level of strategy is the responsibility of the United States Department of State.

According to William M. Leary, a University of Georgia historian who analyzed Laotian operations in a study backed by the CIA's Center for the Study of Intelligence, CIA-led covert action in Laos was the largest paramilitary operation in the history of the Agency. Although a large body of evidence exists claiming that the CIA was knowingly complicit in opium smuggling operations, Leary takes a position which claims that the CIA, which funded his work, was not complicit in the drug trade.

For more than 13 years, the Agency directed native forces that fought major North Vietnamese units to a standstill. As Joseph Westermeyer, who spent the years 1965 to 1975 in Laos as a physician, public health worker, and researcher, wrote in Poppies, Pipes, and People: "American-owned airlines never knowingly transported opium in or out of Laos, nor did their American pilots ever profit from its transport. Yet every plane in Laos undoubtedly carried opium at some time, unknown to the pilot and his superiors--just as had virtually every pedicab, every Mekong River sampan, and every missionary jeep between China and the Gulf of Siam. If the CIA was not involved in the drug trade, it did know about it. As former DCI William Colby acknowledged, the Agency did little about it during the 1960s, but later took action against the traders as drugs became a problem among American troops in Vietnam. The CIA's main focus in Laos remained on fighting the war, not on policing the drug trade.

=== Southwest Asia ===
While the CIA reports on the flow of opium, and its derivative, heroin, in Southwest Asia, US government researchers also observe that the indirect effects of the United States Department of Defense and the Central Intelligence Agency, as well as the Afghan Northern Alliance, have increased the flow."Afghanistan and Pakistan produced an estimated 41 percent of the world's opium in 1998. Europe remains the primary market for Southwest Asian heroin, but the drug is also consumed in Africa, the United States, and Canada."

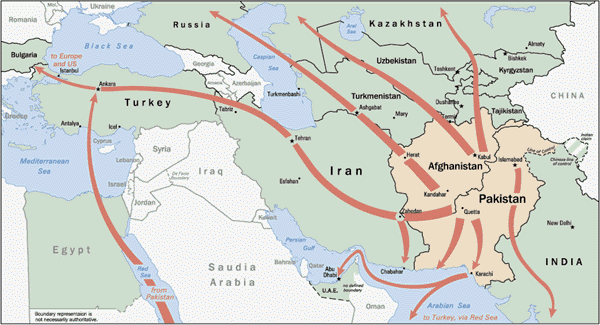
CIA map of major heroin flows from Southwest Asia

According to the CIA flow study,

- Most Southwest Asian heroin flows overland through Iran and Turkey to Europe via the Balkans. Although regional conflicts have forced traffickers to modify delivery routes, the Balkans remain the primary passageway for Southwest Asian heroin bound for Western Europe. Heroin and opium shipments are smuggled from Turkey in bonded trucks, buses, or personal vehicles to Western Europe for distribution.
- An undetermined amount of Southwest Asian heroin flows directly from Pakistan to overseas markets concealed in maritime containers, or carried by couriers on commercial air flights to the Middle East, Europe, Africa, the US, and Canada.
- The Central Asian states, Turkmenistan, Uzbekistan, Tajikistan, Kazakhstan, and Kyrgyzstan have emerged as important smuggling routes for Southwest Asian heroin moving to or through Russia and Eastern Europe. Loose border controls, lack of regional counternarcotics resources, and a growing Russian heroin market facilitate the movement of drugs through Central Asia by vehicle, train, and commercial air means.

LTC John Glaze, USAF, Deputy Commander of the 353rd Special Operations Group at Kadena Air Base, Japan, writing for the Strategic Studies Institute of the U.S. Army War College,

Opium production in Afghanistan has skyrocketed since the U.S. military teamed with the Central Intelligence Agency (CIA) and Afghanistan's Northern Alliance in toppling the Taliban in 2001 ... This growing opium trade is threatening to destabilize the Afghan government and turn the conflict-ridden country back into a safe haven for drug traffickers and terrorists.

He quotes Afghan President Hamid Karzai as saying "Either Afghanistan destroys opium or opium will destroy Afghanistan." Glaze does not suggest that the CIA takes an active role in the ongoing drug trade, but sees the CIA as having influenced the current Afghan economic, governance, and security situations, which encourage the growth of opium and heroin production.

According to the United Nations Office on Drugs and Crime (UNODC)

The magnitude and importance of Afghanistan's opium economy are virtually unprecedented and unique in global experience—it has been roughly estimated as equivalent to 36% of licit (i.e. non-drug) GDP in 2004/05, or if drugs are also included in the denominator, 27% of total drug-inclusive GDP

Karzai, on the Ministry of Counternarcotics webpage in 2006, said "Our goal is to secure a sustainable decrease in poppy cultivation, drug production, consumption of illicit drugs, and trafficking with a view to complete and sustain elimination. As a result, it will pave the way for a pro-poor, private sector-led economic growth." However, as of July 2007, efforts at eradication alienate the population and are carried out only half-heartedly by local military in the face of U.S. pressure. The exact same situation was dramatized in 1989 in the British TV drama Traffik. A 2006 New York Times article said that 2006 Afghan opium production was up 50% over 2005. A recent United Nations report analyzes the economics of the opium industry.

==== Background of the current situation ====
It was alleged by the Soviets on multiple occasions that American CIA agents were helping smuggle opium out of Afghanistan, either into the West, in order to raise money for the Afghan resistance or into the Soviet Union in order to weaken it through drug addiction. According to Alfred McCoy, the CIA supported various Afghan drug lords, for instance Gulbuddin Hekmatyar.

After the September 11, 2001 attacks, a combination of U.S. CIA and military forces (US and allied powers), in support of the Northern Alliance, quickly regained control of Afghanistan from the Taliban, leaving the country "in economic ruin and political chaos. In December 2001, a number of prominent Afghans met in Bonn, Germany, under United Nations (UN) auspices to develop a plan to reestablish the State of Afghanistan, including provisions for a new constitution and national elections. As part of that agreement, the United Kingdom (UK) was designated the lead country in addressing counter-narcotics issues in Afghanistan. Afghanistan subsequently implemented its new constitution and held national elections. On December 7, 2004, Hamid Karzai was formally sworn in as president of a democratic Afghanistan."

Approximately 40,000 foreign troops help manage security in Afghanistan, principally of 32,000 regular soldiers from 37 North Atlantic Treaty Organization (NATO) forces: the International Security Assistance Force. 8,000 US and other special operations forces make up the balance. To manage this turmoil, over 40,000 foreign troops still occupy Afghanistan. There is significant resistance, both from the ideological/theocratic Taliban, especially in southern Afghanistan, and also independent local warlords and drug organizations. Antonio Maria Costa, Executive Director of the United Nations Office on Drugs and Crime (UNODC), described the situation this way: "There is no rule of law in most of the southern parts of Afghanistan—the bullets rule."

It is helpful to be aware of certain areas of Afghanistan, which play a role in the drug traffic.

- "Southern region" of Helmand and Kandahar provinces, on the border with Pakistan, which are the highest-volume areas for drug transactions. There is a traditional route from Helmand, through Pakistan, to Iran
- Herat, in Herat Province, the Northern Alliance stronghold, which borders Iran
- Faizabad, in Badakhshan province, which has borders with Tajikistan, Pakistan, and China.

==== The Afghan economy and opium ====
The 2004 United Nations Development Programme ranked Afghanistan number 173 of 177 countries, using a human development index, with Afghanistan near or at the bottom of virtually every development indicator including nutrition, infant mortality, life expectancy, and literacy. Several factors encourage opium production, the greatest being economic: the high rate of return on investment from opium poppy cultivation has driven an agricultural shift in Afghanistan from growing traditional crops to growing opium poppy. Much of the funds involved do not go through traditional banks, but rather the hawala system, which makes tracking by the CIA much more difficult, although not impossible. See the role of hawala and Afghan drugs, and also the FININT section of CIA transnational anti-terrorism activities.

It must be emphasized that opium cultivation, on this scale, is not traditional.

Despite the fact that only 12 percent of its land is arable, agriculture is a way of life for 70 percent of Afghans and is the country's primary source of income. During good years, Afghanistan produced enough food to feed its people as well as supply a surplus for export. Its traditional agricultural products include wheat, corn, barley, rice, cotton, fruit, nuts, and grapes. However, its agricultural economy has suffered considerably ... Afghanistan's largest and fastest cash crop is opium.

Afghanistan's rugged terrain encourages local autonomy, which, in some cases, means local leadership committed to an opium economy. The terrain makes surveillance and enforcement difficult.

Afghanistan's economy has thus evolved to the point where it is now highly dependent on opium. Although less than 4 percent of arable land in Afghanistan was used for opium poppy cultivation in 2006, revenue from the harvest brought in over $3 billion—more than 35 percent of the country's total gross national product (GNP). According to Antonio Costa, "Opium poppy cultivation, processing, and transport have become Afghanistan's top employers, its main source of capital, and the principal base of its economy." Today, a record 2.9 million Afghanis from 28 of 34 provinces are involved in opium cultivation in some way, which represents nearly 10 percent of the population. Although Afghanistan's overall economy is being boosted by opium profits, less than 20 percent of the $3 billion in opium profits actually goes to impoverished farmers, while more than 80 percent goes into the pockets of Afghan's opium traffickers and kingpins and their political connections. Even heftier profits are generated outside of Afghanistan by international drug traffickers and dealers. Traditionally, processing of Afghan's opium into heroin has taken place outside of Afghanistan; however, in an effort to reap more profits internally, Afghan drug kingpins have stepped up heroin processing within their borders. Heroin processing labs have proliferated in Afghanistan since the late 1990s, particularly in the unstable southern region, further complicating stabilization efforts. With the reemergence of the Taliban and the virtual absence of the rule of law in the countryside, opium production and heroin processing have dramatically increased, especially in the southern province of Helmand.

According to the United Nations Office on Drugs and Crime (UNODC) 2007 Afghanistan Opium Survey, Afghanistan produced approximately 8,200 metric tonnes of opium — nearly double the estimate of global annual consumption. In an April 25, 2007 op-ed in The Washington Post, Antonio Maria Costa, Executive Director of UNODC, asked "Does opium defy the laws of economics? Historically, no. In 2001, prices surged tenfold from 2000, to a record high, after the Taliban all but eliminated opium poppy cultivation across the Afghan territory under its control. So why, with last year's bumper crop, is the opposite not occurring? Early estimates suggest that opium cultivation is likely to increase again this year. That should be an added incentive to sell.

He speculated,

So where is it? I fear there may be a more sinister explanation for why the bottom has not fallen out of the opium market: Major traffickers are withholding significant amounts.

Drug traffickers have a symbiotic relationship with insurgents and terrorist groups such as the Taliban and al-Qaeda. Instability makes opium cultivation possible; opium buys protection and pays for weapons and foot soldiers, and these in turn create an environment in which drug lords, insurgents and terrorists can operate with impunity.

Opium is the glue that holds this murky relationship together. If profits fall, these sinister forces have the most to lose. I suspect that the big traffickers are hoarding surplus opium as a hedge against future price shocks and as a source of funding for future terrorist attacks, in Afghanistan or elsewhere.

As of October, 2009, the Taliban are supporting the opium trade and deriving funding from it.

==== Corruption and the erosion of the rule of law ====
Corruption associated with the opium economy has spread to all levels of the Afghan government from the police to the parliament, and is eroding the rule of law. Farmers routinely bribe police and counternarcotics eradication personnel to turn a blind eye. Law enforcement personnel are also paid off by drug traffickers to ignore or, in some cases, protect their movements. Afghan government officials are now believed to be involved in at least 70 percent of opium trafficking, and experts estimate that at least 13 former or present provincial governors are directly involved in the drug trade ... In some cases ... [local leaders] are the same individuals who cooperated with the United States in ousting the Taliban in 2001.

Again, that hawala handles and launders much of the funds involved make enforcement even more difficult.

Working with the UK and the Afghan government, the United States developed its own strategy to counter the opium problem in Afghanistan, which has the following five pillars:

1. alternative livelihoods
2. elimination and eradication
3. interdiction
4. law enforcement and justice reform
5. public information

The Department of State (DoS), the U.S. Agency for International Development (USAID), the Department of Defense (DoD), and the Department of Justice (DoJ) are the primary organizations involved in carrying out this counternarcotics strategy for the US. The role of the CIA has not been mentioned, although the CIA is involved in preparing lists of terrorism suspects for the United States Department of the Treasury Office of Foreign Assets Control. UNODC's executive director believes these measures are insufficient: "What can be done? Since NATO forces are wary of making enemies out of opium farmers by being associated with eradication, and since the Afghan government is opposed to spraying poppy fields, rounding up the major traffickers may be the best available option for disrupting Afghanistan's lucrative opium market."

Both demand and supply reduction are important. "the consuming countries need to get serious about curbing drug addiction. If there was less demand for heroin, the bottom really would fall out of the opium market." Farmers economically dependent on opium must have viable alternatives that give sustainable income. On the supply side, identifying the most-wanted traffickers and subjecting them to international arrest warrants with extradition, asset seizure, and travel bans could help. While it is not easy to destroy opium storage and heroin production laboratories, it is far easier to destroy drugs at the source than in transit.

"Afghanistan's neighbors are either accomplices or victims in the opium trade, so they need to be part of the solution. They could, for example, improve intelligence-sharing and border security to ensure that more opium is seized. At the moment, less than a quarter of the world's opium is intercepted, compared with around half of global cocaine output." This complicates, of course, the complex US relations with Pakistan and Iran.

==== The nexus between the drug industry and hawala ====
There is an important nexus between drugs and hawala (informal money transfer system) in Afghanistan. The UN analysis is based on interviews with a sample of 54 hawala brokers in the main centers of hawala activity of Afghanistan as well as during a visit to Peshawar, Pakistan. In addition, interviews were conducted with users of the hawala system (drug dealers, businessmen, traders, international aid workers), regulators (government officials, central bank personnel), and formal service providers (bankers, accountants). In addition to hawala, they found protection payments and connections, by which the drug industry has major linkages with local administration as well as high levels of the national government.

See informal money transfer systems to support clandestine activity, including terrorism, drug trade, and intelligence collection. See the section of the article, CIA transnational anti-terrorism activities on how the intelligence community and the United States Department of the Treasury attempt to control hawala used to finance terrorism.

Different localities studied by the UNODC give different views of the laundering of drug funds. It is difficult to get a solid sense of the overall economy. In Faizabad (a city located in the Ayodhya district, Uttar Pradesh, India), for example, indicated that during certain times of the year close to 100% of the liquidity of the hawala system in the province is derived from drugs, whereas in Herat, the Northern Alliance stronghold, it was estimated that only 30% of the hawala market's overall transaction volume is directly linked to drugs. Analysis of data gathered in places like Herat was complicated by confirmed links between drug money and legitimate imports. The southern region (Helmand and Kandahar provinces) is also a key centre for money laundering in Afghanistan (about 60% of the funds are drug related and 80-90% of the hawala dealers in Kandahar [the former Taliban stronghold] and Helmand are involved in money transfers related to narcotics).

Helmand has emerged as a key facilitator of the opium trade, both between provinces and exports, while overall estimates of the local hawala markets' drug-related component are of a similar order of magnitude to those in Kandahar. This finding adds weight to the notion that the major trading centers in these two neighboring provinces should be treated as essentially one market. Bearing this in mind, the study calculated that Helmand could account for roughly US$800 million of Afghanistan's drug-related hawala business and that Herat is the second largest contributor, with in the range of US$300–500 million of drug money laundered annually.

Furthermore, Dubai appears to be a central clearing house for international hawala activities. In addition, various cities in Pakistan, notably Peshawar, Quetta, and Karachi, are major transaction centers. It appears that even in the case of drug shipments to Iran, payments for them come into Afghanistan from Pakistan ... the hawala system has been key to the deepening and widening of the "informal economy" in Afghanistan, where there is anonymity and the opportunity to launder money.

Hawala, however, also contributes positively to the regional economy. It has been central to the survival of Afghanistan's financial system through war. According to Maimbo (2003), "integral to processes of early developmentand vital for the continued delivery of funds to the provinces." "The hawala system also plays an important role in currency exchange. It participates in the Central Bank's regular foreign currency auctions, and was instrumental in the successful introduction of a new currency for Afghanistan in 2002–2003."

==== Possible effects on Iran ====
There are claims and counterclaims that the US may have used groups involved in drug smuggling in an effort to destabilize Iran. Hard evidence is lacking. The group, "Jundullah", is made up of ethnic Balochis, and is in the Balochistan region of Pakistan, bordering Iran. It has taken responsibility for the deaths and kidnappings of more than a dozen Iranian soldiers and officials. Again, there is no hard evidence. The situation also may reflect a conflict between the U.S. military and the Vice-President Dick Cheney, in that the military believes the weapons may be purchased through the drug trade, but Cheney believes they are being supplied by the government of Iran.

The Inter Press Service report quoted United States Undersecretary of State Nicholas Burns as saying, on June 12, 2007, that Iran was "transferring arms to the Taliban in Afghanistan", putting it in the context of a larger alleged Iranian role of funding "extremists" in the Palestinian territories, Lebanon and Iraq. "The following day he asserted that there was "irrefutable evidence" of such Iranian arms supply to the Taliban." The reporter mentioned that Cheney had used the same phrase "irrefutable evidence" on September 20, 2002, in referring to the administration's accusation that Saddam Hussein had a programme to enrich uranium as the basis for a nuclear weapon. It is the reporter's theory that the recurrence of the phrase meant the statement could have been crafted by Cheney, but it also could be a coincidental use of a phrase that has been used in other official announcements.

The Jundallah group is made up Balochi tribesmen, often operating out of Pakistan, but the Balochi have a complex relationship with Pakistan, Iran, and Afghanistan. While news sources agree that the US government has not made a Presidential Finding that covert action is needed, nor reported such action to the eight senior members of Congress who oversee the most sensitive operations, the argument is made that CIA subsidies go to Pakistan, which, in turn, funds the group. If Pakistan does all the funding, the letter of the law would be followed, in that the US is not subsidizing the group.

It is possible that, as in Southeast Asia, the activities of a group are not directly funded, but are funded by allowing them to operate in the drug trade. General Dan Kelly McNeill, the NATO commander in Afghanistan, pointed to the "U.S. command's knowledge of the link between the heroin trade and trafficking in arms between southeastern Iran and southern Afghanistan. The main entry point for opium and heroin smuggling between Afghanistan and Iran runs through the Iranian province of Sistan-Baluchistan to the capital of Zahedan. The two convoys of arms which were intercepted by NATO forces last spring had evidently come through that Iranian province."

According to a report by Robert Tait of The Guardian February 17, Sistan and Baluchestan province of Iran has also been the setting for frequent violent incidents involving militant Sunni groups and drug traffickers. Tait reported that more than 3,000 Iranian security personnel had been killed in armed clashes with drug traffickers since the 1979 Islamic revolution.

CIA representatives denied involvement to ABC News, saying "the account of alleged CIA action is false" and reiterated that the U.S. provides no funding of the Jundullah group, and no hard evidence of US involvement. Pakistani government sources say the secret campaign against Iran by Jundullah was on the agenda when Vice President Dick Cheney met with Pakistani President Pervez Musharraf in February.

While Herat is not the highest-volume area of opium trade, Herat, and the other Iranian border areas of Farah, and Nimroz, have some of the highest prices, presumably due to demand from the Iranian market. "Opium prices are especially high in Iran, where law enforcement is strict and where a large share of the opiate consumption market is still for opium rather than heroin. Not surprisingly, it appears that very significant profits can be made by crossing the Iranian border or by entering Central Asian countries like Tajikistan."

"The UNODC estimates 60 percent of Afghanistan's opium is trafficked across Iran's border (much of it in transit to Europe). Seizures of the narcotic by Iranian authorities in the first half of this year are up 29 percent from the same period last year, according to the country's police chief, as reported by Radio Free Europe/Radio Liberty (RFE/RL)... The Washington Post reports that Iran has the world's highest per capita number of opium addicts ... Experts say those affected most are the millions of unemployed Iranians and youth chafing under the restrictions placed on them from the Islamic government and basij, or civilian morals police. The Iranian government has gone through several phases in dealing with its drug problem.

First, during the 1980s, its approach was supply-sided: "Law-and-order policies with zero tolerance led to the arrest of tens of thousands of addicts and the execution of thousands of narcotics traffickers." "There are an estimated 68,000 Iranians imprisoned for drug trafficking and another 32,000 for drug addiction (out of a total prison population of 170,000, based on 2001 statistics)"

Beehner said "Tehran also has spent millions of dollars and deployed thousands of troops to secure its porous 1,000-mile border with Afghanistan and Pakistan ... a few hundred Iranian drug police die each year in battles with smugglers. Referring to the head of the UNODC office in Iran, Roberto Arbitrio, Beehner quoted Arbitrio in an interview with The Times. "You have drug groups like guerrilla forces, [who] ... shoot with rocket launchers, heavy machine guns, and Kalashnikovs."

A second-phase strategy came under President Mohammad Khatami, focused more on prevention and treatment. Drug traffic is considered a security problem, and much of it is associated with Baluchi tribesmen, who recognize traditional tribal rather than national borders. Current (2007) reports cite Iranian concern with ethnic guerillas on the borders, possibly supported by the CIA.

Iranian drug strategy changed again under President Mahmoud Ahmadinejad, who took office in 2005. Iran's drug policy has been reconsidered and shifted back toward supply interdiction and boosting border security. It is unclear if this is connected to more wide-ranging concerns with border security, perhaps in relation to Baluchi guerillas in Iran.

Samii's 2003 paper described Iran's "primary approach to the narcotics threat [as] interdiction.Iran shares a 936 kilometer border with Afghanistan and a 909 kilometer border with Pakistan, and the terrain in the two eastern provinces—Sistan va Baluchestan and Khorasan—is very rough. The Iranian government has set up static defenses along this border. This includes concrete dams, berms, trenches, and minefields...

== Slavery ==
Various forms of slavery are still present throughout the world. Some put individuals into local service for labor, sex, or the related issues of child soldiers. There is also a form that ships individuals from less developed to more developed countries. Others are based on debt bondage. The US has a Special Advisor to the Secretary of State, at an Ambassadorial level, to deal with the problem in the Office to Monitor and Combat Trafficking in Persons.

A CIA analyst in an independent research program characterized the agency's understanding of the problem.

Trafficking of women and children for the sex industry and for labor is prevalent in all regions of the United States. An estimated 45,000 to 50,000 women and children are trafficked annually to the United States, primarily by small crime rings and loosely connected criminal networks. The trafficked victims have traditionally come from Southeast Asia and Latin America; however, increasingly they are coming from the New Independent States and Central and Eastern Europe. Trafficking to the US is likely to increase given weak economies and few job opportunities in the countries of origin; low risk of prosecution and enormous profit potential for the traffickers; and improved international transportation infrastructures. Though it may be impossible to eradicate trafficking to the US, it is possible to diminish the problem significantly by targeted prevention and microcredit strategies in the source countries; strengthening the penalties and laws against traffickers in this country; and enhancing assistance and protections for the victims.

CIA provided analytic support to the Department of State on human smuggling and trafficking, with an expert who oversaw the assessment, drafting, and coordination of the 2002 Trafficking in Persons report. As part of intergovernmental work, it collected and reported intelligence to US law enforcement agencies conducting operations against members of Latin American and Middle Eastern terrorist groups and against smugglers of aliens into the United States.

== Financial crime and money laundering ==
CIA works with the United States Department of the Treasury Financial Crimes Enforcement Network (FINCen). With respect to efforts to apply the Patriot Act to a foreign bank involved in money laundering. CIA analysts identified key players in the bank, their relationship to international organized crime, and the bank's efforts to hide its accounts from US law enforcement. See Financial intelligence (FININT).

== See also ==
- Allegations of CIA drug trafficking
