= International counter-terrorism activities of the CIA =

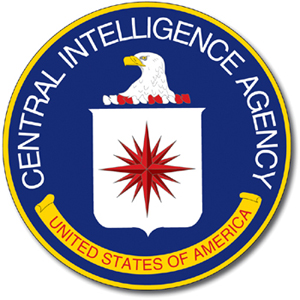
Seal of the CIA

After the Central Intelligence Agency lost its role as the coordinator of the entire United States Intelligence Community (IC), special coordinating structures were created by each president to fit his administrative style and the perceived level of threat from terrorists during his term.

The US has a different counter-terrorist structure than many of its close allies such as Australia, Canada, France, and the United Kingdom. Each has a structure that fits its particular legal system and culture. A contentious issue is whether there needs to be a domestic intelligence service separate from the FBI, which has had difficulty in breaking away from its law enforcement roots and cooperating with other intelligence services.

The National Counterterrorism Center (NCTC) is no longer in the CIA proper, but is in the Office of the Director of National Intelligence (ODNI). The NCTC, however, contains personnel from the CIA, FBI, Department of Justice, and from other members of the IC. A counterterrorism center did exist in the CIA before the NCTC was established.

Given the restrictions of the National Security Act of 1947, which created the CIA but strictly forbade it from having any domestic police authority, the role of the CIA still has multiple dimensions. The Directorate of Operations (DO) of the CIA can infiltrate or otherwise gain human intelligence (HUMINT) from terrorist organizations, their supporters, or from friendly foreign intelligence services. The NCS has a covert operations capability that, possibly in combination with military units from the United States Special Operations Command (USSOCOM), may take direct military action against terrorist groups outside the United States.

The key CIA counter-terror partner is the FBI, which has the domestic operational responsibility for counter-terrorism, which includes both domestic intelligence collection and domestic police work. In the highly decentralized police system of the United States, the FBI also provides liaison and operates cooperatively with state and local police agencies, as well as with relevant federal units, e.g., the United States Coast Guard, which has an important role in preventing terrorist infiltration by sea. Military units have a specialized Counterintelligence Force Protection Source Operations capability to protect their personnel and operations.

== Intelligence Community view of terrorism ==
The United States Intelligence Community had dealt with terrorism long before the September 11, 2001 attacks, including support of guerrillas against the Soviets in Southeast Asia, and other places where the guerrillas' methods may have included terror. In Asia, Latin America, and Africa, the US worked with various foreign governments to suppress terrorism. While government research suggests personality traits that may be common to a substantial number of terrorists, terrorism has few other constants. It has taken place on every continent except Antarctica.

In all these cases, intelligence support from the CIA was required. In some of them, clandestine intelligence collection and covert action by CIA personnel, or those they sponsored, dealt with terrorists and performed counter-terrorist roles.

Many studies of the analysis of, and countermeasures to, terrorism remain classified. Declassified CIA documents on terrorism date back to the late 1970s. According to a 1979 report Western Europe often had opposing terrorist groups in the same conflict at that time, such as nationalists and separatists in Northern Ireland, Spanish nationalists and Basque separatists in Spain and others like them in Turkey. Transnational terrorism was still unusual, although the report noted that the Basque group ETA was active in France as well as Spain.

There are relevant observations from government reports by researchers who have various levels of access into the IC, including the Federal Research Division (FRD) and Congressional Research Service of the Library of Congress. A 1999 FRD study examined some changes from terrorists of the past, especially the emergence of terrorist acts carried out by individuals and members of small, ad hoc groups largely unknown to security organizations. Tactics, as well as sources, had changed, with the greater use of suicide attacks and attacks by women and children.

A very significant concern has been the possible use by terrorists of weapons of mass destruction (WMD).

=== Weapons of mass destruction ===
Terrorists have already made multiple attacks using WMD, such as chemical attacks by Aum Shinrikyo. A 1996 CIA presentation reviewed the history to date, including Iraq's (now defunct) programs.

Researchers for a 1999 General Accounting Office study had classified access, and concluded that terrorists could use some chemicals like chlorine with relative ease for an attack, while other agents, chemical and biological, would require greater sophistication.

== Collection approach ==
=== HUMINT ===
Efforts to use HUMINT operations with non-official cover, especially in the areas outside the groups' staging areas, have been disappointing. Stepped-up efforts to use non-official cover, especially in Europe, began by creating covers in investment banks and consulting firms. Only several years later was it realized that terrorists would have little to do with such organizations. Another realization was that, even with excellent cover, HUMINT successes would be unlikely to recruit people deep inside the terrorist cells.

Where HUMINT had more potential, and where the cover organizations needed to change to help find appropriate targets, was on the fringes of the terrorist organizations, either groups from which the group would need goods or services, or from people with awareness of the groups but not supporting them. For example, there are reports that 15 cargo ships are linked to al-Qaeda, whose activities at port might draw the attention of security officials, or even low-level dockworkers or craftsmen.

=== SIGINT ===
Signals intelligence, or SIGINT, is a common tool in espionage, although it has been hard to apply to anti-terrorism activities. The National Security Agency (NSA), the organization formally responsible for SIGINT within the United States intelligence community, was used to targeting conventional military communications systems, while terrorists lacked dedicated communications systems, confronting the NSA with the prospect of "picking out the needles of terrorist transmissions in the haystack". While some information has been gained, SIGINT is only effective against cells if the group is unaware they are being monitored. Once known communication methods have been compromised, terrorists switch to other means. Terrorists may employ various countersurveillance techniques, including the use of non-electronic messengers to avoid interception, employ encrypted message systems, or exploit public Internet connections such as Internet cafes.

The actual interception of messages is probably not done by the CIA, but by NSA or possibly Service Cryptologic Elements (SCE): tactical SIGINT detachments attached to military tactical units. Important communications intercepts have been achieved, with the results clearly available to the CIA. There are cases, however, where a joint CIA-NSA organization places clandestine intercept equipment. The National Security Archive commented, "In 1987, Deputy Director for Science and Technology Evan Hineman established ... a new Office for Special Projects. Concerned not with satellites, but with emplaced sensors – sensors that could be placed in a fixed location to collect signals intelligence or measurement and signature intelligence (MASINT) about a specific target. Such sensors had been used to monitor Chinese missile tests, Soviet laser activity, military movements, and foreign nuclear programs. The office was established to bring together scientists from the DS&T's Office of SIGINT Operations, who designed such systems, with operators from the Directorate of Operations, who were responsible for transporting the devices to their clandestine locations and installing them."

While communications intercepts are usually highly classified, they have come up in US Congressional testimony on terrorism. For example, an FBI official testified with regard to the 1998 United States embassy bombings in Kenya and Tanzania, which took place so closely in time that the terrorist teams can reasonably be assumed to have coordinated their operations in near real-time.

There was independent proof of the involvement of Bin Laden, Al-Qaeda and EIJ Egyptian Islamic Jihad in the bombings. First, the would-be suicide bomber, al-Owhali, ran away from the bomb truck at the last minute and survived. However, he had no money or passport or plan by which to escape Kenya. Days later, he called a telephone number in Yemen and thus arranged to have money transferred to him in Kenya. That same telephone number in Yemen was contacted by Osama Bin Laden's satellite phone on the same days that al-Owhali was arranging to get money.

They have also been revealed in legal proceedings against terrorists, such as United States v. Osama bin Laden et al., indictment, Nov. 4, 1998, and updates.

=== IMINT ===
The sort of imagery intelligence (IMINT), often from satellites, used against nation-states is of limited use in tracking the movement of groups of small size and little physical infrastructure. More success has come from unmanned aerial vehicles (UAV), which are hard to see and hear, to do such things as follow cars, or loiter above a building, photographic traffic in and out, often with low-light or infrared sensors that work in apparent darkness. For instance, the CIA experimented with the MQ-1 Predator, a small remote-controlled reconnaissance aircraft, to try to spot Bin Laden in Afghanistan, producing probable sightings of the al-Qaeda leader after a series of flights in autumn 2000, overseen by CTC officials and flown by USAF drone pilots at the CIA's Langley headquarters.

=== FININT ===
Financial intelligence – "following the money" – often can trace the organization behind a particular attack. Once that organization is identified, value transfers from it can point to other operational cells. The term value includes cash and negotiable documents, but also materials such as gems, opium and drugs, and precious metals. The Treasury Department's Office of Foreign Assets Control (OFAC) has the power to "freeze" the accounts of organizations suspected of funding terrorist activities.

Terrorist groups use three types of financing, which are increasingly difficult to track by U.S. intelligence, including the CIA:

1. Charities, which use both conventional financial institutions and informal value transfer systems,
2. Informal value transfer systems such as hawala and hundi
3. "Commodities- or trade-based money laundering includes the smuggling of bulk cash and the evasion of federal reporting requirements used to track money laundering with commodities such as diamonds, precious metals, gold, and tobacco." The CIA is most likely to gain awareness of commodities and trade transfers outside the United States.

According to the Center for Defense Information (CDI), intelligence agencies help OFAC build its "freeze list" by sending it lists of individuals and organizations believed to be associated with terror, but not all such suspects go onto the freeze list, since the intelligence community can use financial transactions as a means of tracking them.

One of the challenges of anti-terrorist FININT is that surveillance of transactions only works when the value transfers go through conventional, regulated banks and other financial institutions. Many cultures use informal value transfer systems, such as the hawala widely used in the Middle East and Asia, where value is transferred through a network of brokers, who operate with funds often not in banks, with the value transfer orders through personal communications among brokers, who know one another and operate on a paperless honor system.

According to CDI,

The founder of Al Barakaat, Shaykh Ahmed Nur Jimale, is believed to be an associate of bin Laden who invested in and is still an owner of the organization. Al Barakaat is a financial, telecommunications and construction group headquartered in Dubai and operating largely out of Somalia. It was founded in 1989 and operates in 40 countries around the world. ... The Treasury Department said the raids on Nov. 7 resulted in the blocking of approximately $971,000 in Al Barakaat assets.

== Analytic approach ==
The National Security Archive makes the point that the US government and intelligence community did not suddenly come upon terrorism on September 11, 2001. Understanding the IC and political perceptions of the past help predict the future, identify weaknesses, and develop strategies.

... at the beginning of the Reagan administration, Secretary of State Alexander Haig announced that opposition to terrorism would replace the Carter administration's focus on advancing human rights throughout the world. Although opposition to terrorism never really became the primary focus of the Reagan administration or successor administrations, each of these paid significant attention to the issue and produced many important documents that shed light on the policy choices faced today. Terrorism has been the subject of numerous presidential and Defense Department directives as well as executive orders. Terrorist groups and terrorist acts have been the focus of reports by both executive branch agencies (for example, the State Department, CIA, and FBI) as well as Congressional bodies – including the Senate Select Committee on Intelligence and the Congressional Research Service. The General Accounting Office has also produced several dozen reports evaluating the U.S. government's ability to prevent or mitigate terrorist strikes ...

The CIA's Directorate of Intelligence produces analytic products that can help identify terrorist groups, their structure, and plans. These may benefit from signals intelligence from the National Security Agency (NSA), from imagery intelligence from the National Reconnaissance Office (NRO) and National Geospatial-Intelligence Agency (NGA), from the Financial Crimes Enforcement Network (FinCEN) of the Department of the Treasury, and from other specialized agencies.

=== Regular research ===
The Department of State, with CIA assistance, prepares an annual volume called Patterns in Terrorism. FBI reporting is more irregular, but does do problem descriptions as well as specific reports.

=== Virtual station and cross-functional team research ===
While the initial implementation, the Bin Laden Issue Station, did not work well, there has been an Intelligence Community effort to avoid the problems of stovepiping, especially where it involves lack of communication between analysts and operators. There is a continuing controversy about ensuring Federal Bureau of Investigation (FBI) information gets to analysts; the FBI culture has been extremely decentralized, so "dots to be connected" in two field offices were not shared; this was particularly relevant in the aftermath of the September 11 attacks.

The overall problems of stovepiping and encouraging cross-functional teams, in the context of terrorism, has been addressed by, among other groups, the House Intelligence Committee. One of their chief recommendations was:

FBI's main problem going forward is to overcome its information sharing failures. "Ensuring adequate information sharing" should be communicated throughout the Bureau as the Director's top priority, and a clear strategy incorporating the personnel dimension, the technical dimension, and the legal dimension of the information-sharing problem should be developed and communicated immediately.

Their recommendations for the CIA included:

CIA leadership must ensure that HUMINT collection remains a central core competency of the agency, and should develop additional operational tools, in conjunction with other appropriate agencies (FBI, etc,), penetrate terrorist cells, disrupt terrorist operations and capture and render terrorists to law enforcement as appropriate. More core collectors need to be put on the streets.

ClA should ensure that a management structure is in place to steward the multiyear investments needed to build new platforms to collect on terrorist targets. CIA must also ensure sufficient numbers of unilateral CT slots in field stations and bases.

CIA should lead an effort to improve watchlisting to ensure that all relevant agencies, including FBI, Homeland Security, and others, have access to a common database of up-to-date terrorist person-related data collected by US government agencies and other appropriate sources. The creation of a terrorism watchlisting unit at CIA may be a useful first step.

Require all new case officers and analysts to achieve a "level 3" language proficiency prior to initial deployment, and devise a mechanism for ensuring language skill maintenance is incentivized and directly tied to performance evaluation.

CIA should take immediate and sustained steps to dramatically improve all aspects of its CT training program. Establish structures in CTC (Counterterrorism Center) in such a manner that ensures a normal career path for these officers. Incorporate counterterrorism-related skill development in all appropriate training for case officers and analysts.

Internal policies, such as CTC's 'no threshold' threat reporting policy, should be reviewed and modified to ensure that consumers are getting the most reliable reporting and that sufficient analysis is applied to that product in advance of its wholesale dissemination, wherever possible.

The 1995 guidelines must be rescinded immediately, and replaced with new guidelines that balance concerns about human rights behavior and law breaking with the need for flexibility to take advantage of opportunities to gather information on terrorist activities, as required by law.

Under Porter Goss, for a variety of reasons, including innovation, the CIA has proposed moving its National Resources Division, concerned with issues in the U.S., to Denver, letting it work more freely than under Headquarters bureaucracy. Some officers believe this is a bad idea and would hurt information sharing, the critical problem with the FBI. With regard to the prohibition on the CIA having any domestic law enforcement powers:

... FBI is having significant problems developing its own domestic intelligence branch and the CIA is generally viewed across the intelligence community as more experienced and skilled at handling foreign informants who eventually return abroad, where the CIA has the lead in intelligence gathering and operations.

=== Regional analytic operations ===
The CIA (and its predecessors) has a long history of placing selected collection and analytic functions (e.g., Foreign Broadcast Information Service intercept locations) in places where they can coordinate with regional intelligence agencies, and also have access to people with native-level understanding of languages and culture.

== Intelligence and terrorism in the 1970s ==
While there were no major foreign terror actions in the US during the early part of the decade, there were actions against US personnel and facilities in other countries. Terrorism was definitely present as a worldwide phenomenon, and the CIA produced regular reports on it.

Terrorism in the US was not necessarily directed at American organizations. For example, exiled Chilean Foreign Minister Orlando Letelier was killed by a car bomb in Washington, D.C. Subsequent investigations suggested the bombers may have had CIA ties in Chile. "... in February 1976, President Gerald Ford signed Executive Order (EO) 11905 which forbade all U.S. government employees from engaging in or conspiring to engage in political assassination" (Section 5(g)).

=== 1978 ===
Ford's EO was superseded by President Jimmy Carter's EO 12036, which tightened restrictions on intelligence agencies. The ban on assassinations was continued by President Ronald Reagan in 1981, (EO 12333, Sec 2.11) and extended to apply specifically to intelligence agencies. This ban remains in effect today, although challenges were mounted by Rep. Bob Barr, R-Ga, including sponsoring the Terrorist Elimination Act of 2001.

Italian Prime Minister Aldo Moro was seized by the Red Brigades and later killed, which brought additional NATO attention to the problem.

=== 1979 ===
In January, Iranian militants captured the buildings and staff of the US embassy in Tehran. A number of CIA operational documents were reconstructed.

In November, there was Muslim-on-Muslim violence with the seizure of the Grand Mosque in Mecca. French security forces assisted the Saudis in recapturing the building, indicating that ad hoc alliances would form for both terrorism and counterterrorism.

== Intelligence and terrorism in the 1980s ==
It became increasingly obvious in the 1980s that there is no generally accepted definition of terrorism, as a unique offense. For example, many discussions of terrorism emphasize it is directed against noncombatants.

Attacks by non-state actors, such as the 1983 Beirut barracks bombing of US and French troops under UN auspices, are more problematic. The Beirut attacks are usually called "terrorism" in news reports, but if terrorism is assumed to be against noncombatants, they may not qualify. The organizers and attackers might well be categorized as illegal combatants under the Geneva Conventions, but the Conventions do not define terrorism.

During this decade, the US supported Muslim fighters against the Soviets in Afghanistan. The training and arms supplied may have helped start transnational jihadist groups.

=== 1982 ===
In April 1982, President Ronald Reagan signed National Security Decision Directive (NSDD) 30 dealing with responses to armed attacks on U.S. citizens or assets. The NSDD created a coordinating body, the Interdepartmental Group on Terrorism, to develop and assign to various executive agencies specific responsibilities when terrorist incidents occurred. The objective was to have in place, before an incident occurred, guidelines for such matters as lines of authority, intelligence responsibilities, and response training. A Special Situation Group (SSG) was established to advise the president, and lead agencies to coordinate responses were named.

1. For international terrorist incidents outside U.S. territory, the State Department had the lead role.
2. For incidents, the Justice Department was to be the lead agency with the Federal Bureau of Investigation (FBI) in the lead for operational response.
3. For plane hijackings within the "special jurisdiction of the United States, the lead agency was the Federal Aviation Administration.
4. For planning and managing public health aspects of terrorist incidents, the Federal Emergency Management Agency (FEMA) was the responsible agency.

Supporting the SSG was a Terrorist Incident Working Group with representatives from the Departments of State and Defense, the Director of Central Intelligence, the FBI, FEMA, and the National Security Staff. It was to give "direct operational support ... and to provide advice and recommendations during an incident" to the SSG.

In November 1982, following the establishment of the DoD Inspector General, the Deputy Secretary of Defense directed that the Inspector General for Intelligence be redesignated as the Assistant to the Secretary of Defense (Intelligence Oversight) (ATSD (IO)). Today, the ATSD (IO) reports on Intelligence Oversight activities at least quarterly to the Secretary of Defense and, through him, to the Intelligence Oversight Board (IOB), a standing committee of the President's Foreign Intelligence Advisory Board (PFIAB).

=== 1983 ===
The major terrorist incident was the bombing of a UN observer force in Beirut, which led to considerable rethinking of U.S. rules of engagement, the deterrent effect of a US presence, and the issue of force protection intelligence.

==== 1983 Beirut barracks bombing ====
Suicide attacks in Beirut cost the lives of 241 American and 58 French soldiers, with many casualties. Often called terrorist attacks, this designation seems to be more a facet of the means of attack, and that it was carried out by non-national actors, than that it was intended to terrorize a civilian population.

Further complicating the designation is that there is no consensus on who sponsored the attacks. A US court did find Iran responsible, which would make it an attack by a nation-state on military personnel of two other nation-states. In 2001, former Secretary of Defense Caspar Weinberger stated: "But we still do not have the actual knowledge of who did the bombing of the Marine barracks at the Beirut Airport, and we certainly didn't then."

Rules of engagement for the Marines were restrictive; they could not set up what would be considered today a safe perimeter against truck bombs. They carried rifles that had to be loaded before use; there were no heavier weapons that could deflect a truck or destroy its engine.

The Commission termed this a terrorist attack, and raised questions about the intelligence support available to it (emphasis added):

Intelligence provided a good picture of the broad threat facing the USMNF [US multinational force] in Lebanon. Every intelligence agency in the national community and throughout the chain of command disseminated a great amount of analysis and raw data. Key Defense officials and the military chain of command ere alert to, and concerned with, the insights it provided them. There was an awareness of the existing dangerous situation at every level, but no one had specific information on how, where and when the threat would be carried out. Throughout the period of the USMNF presence in Lebanon, intelligence sources were unable to provide proven, accurate, definitive information on terrorist tactics against our forces. This shortcoming held to be the case on October 23, 1983. The terrorist threat was just one among many threats facing the USMNF from the many factions armed with artillery, crew served weapons and small arms.

The USMNF was operating in an urban environment surrounded by hostile forces without any way of pursuing the accuracy of data in order to head off attack. The intelligence structure should be reviewed from both a design and capabilities standpoint. We need to establish ourselves early in a potential trouble spot and find new techniques to isolate and penetrate our potential enemies. Once established, our military forces (and especially ground forces) need to have aggressive, specific intelligence to give the commander the hard information he needs to counter the threats against his force. U.S. intelligence is primarily geared for the support of air and naval forces engaged in nuclear and conventional warfare. Significant attention must be given by the entire U.S. intelligence structure to purging and refining of masses of generalized information into intelligence analysis useful to small unit ground commanders.

=== 1984 ===
In 1984, the CIA both suffered from terrorism directed at it, and also supported anti-Soviet guerrillas in Afghanistan that the Soviets considered terrorists.

==== Kidnapping of CIA Beirut station chief and US response authorizing preemption ====
"NSDD 138 was the next known significant Reagan-era action. It was promulgated after the March 16, 1984 kidnapping of the Central Intelligence Agency's Beirut, Lebanon station chief, William Buckley. This NSDD, much of which remains classified, permitted both the CIA and the Federal Bureau of Investigation to form covert operations teams and to use military special operations forces to conduct guerrilla-style war against guerrillas. The NSDD reportedly permits preemptive operations, retaliation, expanded intelligence collection, and when necessary, killing of guerrillas in "pre-emptive" self-defense. States that sponsored guerrillas, or what today would generally be lumped under the term terrorists, could be targeted for operations. These included Iran, Libya, Syria, Cuba, North Korea – all identified before Sept. 11, 2001 by the State Department as state-sponsors of terrorism. Nicaragua and the Soviet Union were reportedly also on the list."

==== Support to the Afghan resistance ====
The CIA also channeled US aid to Afghan resistance fighters via Pakistan in a covert operation known as Operation Cyclone. It denied dealing with non-Afghan fighters, or having direct contact with bin Laden. However, various authorities relate that the Agency brought both Afghans and Arabs to the United States for military training.

==== Creation of al-Qaeda ====
The network that became known as al-Qaeda ("The Base") grew out of Arab volunteers who fought the Soviets and their puppet regimes in Afghanistan in the 1980s. In 1984 Abdullah Azzam and Osama bin Laden set up an organization known as the Office of Services in Peshawar, Pakistan, to coordinate and finance the "Afghan Arabs", as the volunteers became known.

Azzam and Bin Laden set up recruitment offices in the US, under the name "Al-Khifah", the hub of which was the Farouq Mosque in Brooklyn's Atlantic Avenue. This was "a place of pivotal importance for Operation Cyclone".

=== 1986 ===
==== Foundation of the Counterterrorist Center ====
In the mid-1980s there was a spate of terrorist activity, much of it by Palestinian organizations. In 1986 the CIA founded the Counterterrorist Center, an interdisciplinary body drawing its personnel from the Directorates of Operations, Intelligence, and other US intelligence organizations. It first got to grips with secular terrorism, but found the upcoming Islamist terror much more difficult to penetrate. In the 1990s the latter became a major preoccupation of the center.

=== Afghanistan and its consequences ===
Blowback (referring to operations launched against an enemy which eventually hurt their originators) into the United States may have come from a pipeline, from Brooklyn, New York, to Peshawar, Pakistan, the gateway to joining the Afghan mujahedin. The Brooklyn end was at the Al Kifah Refugee Center, funded by Operation Cyclone, and the associated Afghan Refugee Service. The Maktab al-Khidamat ("Office of Services") was founded in Peshawar in 1984 by Abdullah Azzam and Osama bin Laden to finance and support this effort. "Cold warriors" in the CIA and US State Department looked favorably on these efforts, and considered that they should be formally endorsed and expanded, perhaps along the lines of the international brigades of the Spanish Civil War. "Bin Laden actually did some very good things", said Milton Bearden, chief of the CIA's Islamabad station in the later 1980s. "He put a lot of money in a lot of right places in Afghanistan. He never came on the screen of any Americans as either a terrific asset or someone who was anti-American." The CIA denied, however, actually assisting the "Arab-Afghans", or having direct contact with Bin Laden.

Arrested in the US for the 1998 embassy bombings, was a former Egyptian soldier named Ali Mohamed (sometimes called "al-Amriki", "the American"), who is alleged to have provided training and assistance to Bin Laden's operatives. At that time, however, he was a member of the United States Army Special Forces. FBI special agent Jack Cloonan calls him "bin Laden's first trainer". Originally an Egyptian army captain, in the 1980s Mohamed came to the US and became a supply sergeant to the Green Berets in Fort Bragg. At the same time he was involved with Egyptian Islamic Jihad (which "merged" with al-Qaeda in the 1990s), and later with al-Qaeda itself; he boasted of fighting the Soviets in Afghanistan. He had worked for the CIA in the earlier 1980s, but the agency supposedly dropped him after he boasted of his relationship. However, Mohamed's behavior led his commanding officer, Lt. Col. Robert Anderson, to believe he was still a US intelligence asset. ("I assumed the CIA", said Anderson.) In 1989 Mohamed trained anti-Soviet fighters in his spare time, apparently at the al-Khifah center in Brooklyn. He was honorably discharged from the US military in November 1989.

Another individual associated with the Brooklyn center was the "Blind Sheikh" Omar Abdel-Rahman, a leading recruiter of mujaheddin, who obtained US entry visas with the help of the CIA in 1987 and 1990.

==== Bin Laden's early years: terrorist financier ====
Sometime in late 1988 or early 1989, Bin Laden set up al-Qaeda from the more extreme elements of the Services Office. However, it was not a large organization at the time; when Jamal al-Fadl (who had been recruited through the Brooklyn center in the mid-1980s) joined in 1989, he was described as Qaeda's "third member".

Congressional testimony from then-DCI George Tenet speaks of knowledge and analysis of Bin Laden, from his early years as a terrorist financier to his leadership of a worldwide network of terrorism based in Afghanistan.

According to Tenet, Bin Laden gained prominence during the Afghan war for his role in financing the recruitment, transportation, and training of Arab nationals who fought alongside the Afghan mujahedin against the Soviets during the 1980s. Tenet denied there had been any US government involvement with him until the early nineties.

== Intelligence and terrorism in the 1990s ==
The 1990s were characterized by a wide range of terrorist activities, from a religious cult that used WMDs, to an attack on the World Trade Center by an ad hoc jihadist group, to coordinated al-Qaeda attacks.

Accounts differ on when the United States recognized bin Laden as an individual financier of terror, as opposed to when al-Qaida was recognized as a group.

In the early 1990s, Ali Mohamed, a former United States Army Special Forces supply sergeant, returned to Afghanistan, where he gave training in al-Qaeda camps. According to FBI special agent Jack Cloonan, in one of Mohamed's first classes were Osama bin Laden, Ayman al-Zawahiri, and other al-Qaeda leaders. According to the San Francisco Chronicle, he was involved in planning the 1998 bombings of US embassies in Africa.

=== 1990 ===
Eventually, the Services office and Al-Kifah were also linked to Sheikh Omar Abdel-Rahman, an Egyptian religious leader later jailed for the planned New York bombings. He had entered the US with the full knowledge of the CIA in 1990.

But by the mid-1990s, America's view of Al-Kifah had changed. It discovered that several of those charged with the World Trade Center bombing and the New York landmarks bombings were former Afghan veterans, recruited through the Brooklyn-based organisation. Many of those the US had trained and recruited for a war they were still fighting, but now it was against America. A confidential CIA internal survey concluded that it was 'partly culpable' for the World Trade Center bomb, according to reports of the time. There had been blowback.

Jamal al-Fadl (himself recruited through the Brooklyn center in the mid-1980s) was described as the "third member". Al-Fadl later "defected" to the CIA and provided the agency's Bin Laden unit with a great deal of evidence about al-Qaeda.

=== 1993 ===
On February 26, 1993, the World Trade Center was bombed. A group of the conspirators were arrested, convicted, and imprisoned. There has been no strong argument that al-Qaeda was involved, although there have been allegations, including by a former Director of Central Intelligence, that Iraq supported the operational cell. In a PBS interview in October 2001, former Clinton-era CIA Director James Woolsey argued a supposed link between Ramzi Youssef and the Iraqi intelligence services. He suggested the grand jury investigation turned up evidence pointing to Iraq that the Clinton Justice Department "brushed aside."

Neil Herman, who headed the FBI investigation, noted that despite Yasin's presence in Baghdad, there was no evidence of Iraqi support for the attack. "We looked at that rather extensively," he told CNN terrorism analyst Peter L. Bergen. "There were no ties to the Iraqi government." Bergen writes, "In sum, by the mid-'90s, the Joint Terrorism Task Force in New York, the F.B.I., the U.S. Attorney's office in the Southern District of New York, the C.I.A., the N.S.C., and the State Department had all found no evidence implicating the Iraqi government in the first Trade Center attack."

Claims that Saddam Hussein was behind the bombing are based on the research of Laurie Mylroie of the conservative American Enterprise Institute.

=== 1995 ===
Only a brief mention of Colombian FARC activity is mentioned in the declassified part of the 1995 Terrorism Review.

March 1995 actions by the Japanese cult Aum Shinrikyo demonstrated that the use of WMD is no longer restricted to the battlefield. Japanese authorities have determined that the Aum was working on developing the chemical nerve agents sarin and VX. The cult, which attacked Japanese civilians with sarin gas on March 20, 1995, also tried to mine its own uranium in Australia and to buy Russian nuclear warheads.

=== 1996 ===
The attack on the Khobar Towers in Saudi Arabia is the only declassified subject in the 1996 Terrorism Review. Responsibility for the attack was, at the time of publication of the Review, not determined.

Bin Laden came to the attention of the CIA as an emerging terrorist threat during his stay in Sudan from 1991 to 1996.

The Agency, however, began to be concerned than bin Laden would extend his activities beyond Afghanistan. It experimented with various internal organizations that could focus on subjects such as bin Laden specifically and al-Qaeda generally.

In 1996 an experimental "virtual station" was launched, modeled on the agency's geographically-based stations, but based in Washington and dedicated to a particular transnational issue. It was placed under the Counterterrorist Center (CTC), and, like the CTC, cut across disciplines and drew its personnel from widely across the CIA and other intelligence agencies. Michael Scheuer, who up to then headed the Center's Islamic extremist branch, was asked to run it. Scheuer, who had noticed a stream of intelligence reports about Osama bin Laden, suggested the station be dedicated to this particular individual. The station began to produce evidence that Bin Laden was not only a financier, but also an organizer of terror. Originally dubbed "Terrorist Financial Links" (TFL), the unit soon became rechristened the Bin Laden Issue Station.

Jamal al-Fadl, who defected to the CIA in spring 1996, began to provide the Station with a new image of the Qaeda leader: he was not only a terrorist financier, but a terrorist organizer too, and sought weapons of mass destruction. FBI special agent Dan Coleman (who together with his partner Jack Cloonan had been "seconded" to the Bin Laden Station) called him Qaeda's "Rosetta Stone".

=== 1998 ===
On August 7, 1998, near simultaneous car bomb attacks struck US embassies, and local buildings, in Dar es Salaam, Tanzania and Nairobi, Kenya. The attacks, linked to local members of the al-Qaeda terrorist network headed by Osama bin Laden, brought bin Laden and al-Qaeda to international attention for the first time, and resulted in the U.S. Federal Bureau of Investigation placing bin Laden on its Ten Most Wanted list.

The declassified page of the 1998 Terrorism Review speaks of the release of hostages by Colombia's two major guerrilla organizations, the Revolutionary Armed Forces of Colombia (FARC) and the National Liberation Army (ELN). Kidnapping is the only threat mentioned, with a warning of continued danger to US interests.

The Review makes no mention of other countries or threats, but only the cover and one page were partially declassified.

=== 1999 ===
In 1999 DCI George Tenet launched a grand "Plan" to deal with al-Qaeda. In preparation, he selected new leadership for the Counterterrorist Center (CTC). He placed Cofer Black in charge of the CTC, and "Rich B" (a "top-flight executive" from Tenet's own leadership group) in charge of the CTC's Bin Laden unit. Tenet assigned the CTC to develop the Plan. The proposals, brought out in September, sought to penetrate Qaeda's "Afghan sanctuary" with US and Afghan agents, in order to obtain information on and mount operations against Bin Laden's network. In October, officers from the Bin Laden unit visited northern Afghanistan. Once the Plan was finalized, the Agency created a "Qaeda cell" (whose functions overlapped those of the CTC's Bin Laden unit) to give operational leadership to the effort. CIA intelligence chief Charles E. Allen to set up a "Qaeda cell" was put in charge of the tactical execution of the Plan.

The CIA concentrated its inadequate financial resources on the Plan, so that at least some of its more modest aspirations were realized. Intelligence collection efforts on bin Laden and al-Qaeda increased significantly from 1999. "By 9/11", said Tenet, "a map would show that these collection programs and human [reporting] networks were in place in such numbers as to nearly cover Afghanistan". (But this excluded Bin Laden's inner circle itself.)

Al Qaeda operated as an organization in more than sixty countries, the CIA's Counterterrorist Center calculated by late 1999 [a figure that was to help underpin the "war on terror" two years later]. Its formal, sworn, hard-core membership might number in the hundreds. Thousands more joined allied militias such as the [Afghan] Taliban or the Chechen rebel groups or Abu Sayyaf in the Philippines or the Islamic movement of Uzbekistan. ...

A heavily redacted CIA document, the 1999 Terrorism Review, reveals concern with Libyan support of terrorism, through its External Security Organization (ESO). The ESO is described as responsible for surveillance, assassination, and kidnapping of Libyan dissidents outside the country; examples were given from actions in the United Kingdom and Egypt. Libya was also described as attempting to build influence in sub-Saharan Africa, supporting a range of Palestinian rejectionist groups, and giving funds and equipment to the Moro Islamic Liberation Organization and Abu Sayyaf Group in the Philippines.

In addition, the World Anti-Imperialist Center (Mahatba) and the World Islamic Call Society (WICS) were described as part of terrorist infrastructure. This review does not mention any country, other than Libya, or non-national actor as a sponsor of terrorism, as opposed to an operational terrorist group.

== Intelligence and terrorism in the 2000s ==
=== 2000 ===
On October 12, 2000, three suicide bombers detonated a skiff packed with explosives alongside the American Arleigh Burke-class destroyer USS Cole, which was docked in Aden Harbor, Yemen. The blast blew a hole 20 feet (6.1 m) high and 40 feet (12 m) wide in the ship's hull, killed 17 of the ship's crew and injured 30. "With just slightly more skilled execution, CIA analysts later concluded, the bombers would have killed three hundred and sent the destroyer to the bottom."

The attack on USS Cole had no warning. However, Kie Fallis at the Defense Intelligence Agency, from "data mining and analysis", had "predicted" in early autumn 2000 an al-Qaeda attack by an explosives-laden small boat against a US warship. Further, in late September 2000, the DIA experimental data-mining operation Able Danger had uncovered information of increased al-Qaeda "activity" in Aden Harbor, Yemen. Able Danger elevated Yemen "to be one of the top three hot spots for al-Qaeda in the entire world" and, allegedly days before the Cole attack, warned the Pentagon and administration of the danger, but the supposed warnings were ignored.

==== Clandestine intelligence/covert action ====
In 2000 the CIA and USAF jointly ran a series of flights over Afghanistan with a small remote-controlled reconnaissance drone, the Predator; they obtained probable photos of Bin Laden. Cofer Black and others became advocates of arming the Predator with missiles to try to assassinate Bin Laden and other al-Qaeda leaders.

=== 2001 ===
==== Covert action ====
===== Paramilitary support =====
In the spring of 2001, CIA officers evaluated the forces of Ahmed Shah Massoud, and found his strength less than the previous fall. While the officers gave him cash and supplies, and received intelligence on the Taliban, they did not have the authority to build back his fighting strength against the Taliban.

===== Targeted killing in war versus assassination =====
While the American President has issued Executive Orders banning assassinations, none of those actually defined assassination. Using dictionary rather than statutory definition, a common definition is "murder by surprise for political purposes". Jeffrey Addicott argues that if murder is generally accepted as an illegal act in US and international law, so if assassination is a form of murder, the Orders cannot be making legal something that is already illegal.

The Hague and Geneva Conventions did not consider non-national actors as belligerents in general war. The Conventions do consider spontaneous rising against invasion and civil war as having lawful combatants, but there are many more restrictions of the status, as legal combatants of fighters who came to a war from an external country. This discussion will not address the controversial issue of illegal combatants, but, following Addicott's reasoning, assumes that violence, in defense to an attack, is legal under Article 51 of the UN Charter.

Note that before the attackers in the September 11, 2001 attacks were identified, the US invoked the NATO treaty, without objection, as a member state that had been attacked. "In the War on Terror, it is beyond legal dispute that the virtual-State al-Qa'eda terrorists are aggressors and that the United States is engaging in self-defense when using violence against them."

Black and others became advocates of arming the Predator with AGM-114 Hellfire missiles to try to kill Bin Laden and other al-Qaeda leaders, but there were both legal and technical issues. Tenet in particular was concerned about the CIA moving back into the business of targeted killing. Also, a series of live-fire tests in the Nevada Desert in summer 2001 produced mixed results.

In June 2001, at a test site in Nevada in the US, CIA and Air Force personnel built a replica of Bin Laden's villa in Kandahar, Afghanistan. The Predator controllers tested aiming and firing a Predator missile at the house, and post-strike analysis showed it would have killed anyone in the targeted room. The significance of this demonstration was called a "holy grail" by one participant. A weapon now existed which, at long range, could kill Bin Laden shortly after finding him. Practice runs proved reliable, but, according to The Washington Post, the Bush Administration refrained from such action. On September 4, a new set of directives called for increasing pressure against the Taliban until they either ejected al-Qaeda or faced a serious threat to their continued power, but no decision on using this capability had reached President Bush by September 11.

Tenet advised caution at the Cabinet-level Principals Committee on September 4, 2001. If the Cabinet wanted to empower the CIA to field a lethal drone, he said, "they should do so with their eyes wide open, fully aware of the potential fallout if there were a controversial or mistaken strike". National Security Adviser Condoleezza Rice concluded that the armed Predator was required, but evidently not ready, and she advised the CIA to consider restarting reconnaissance flights. The "previously reluctant" Tenet then ordered the Agency to do so. The CIA was authorized to "deploy the system with weapons-capable aircraft".

==== World-Wide Attack Matrix ====
After 9/11, the CIA was criticized for not having done enough to prevent the attacks. DCI George Tenet rejected the criticism, citing the Agency's planning efforts especially over the preceding two years. His response came in a briefing held on September 15, 2001, where he presented the Worldwide Attack Matrix, a classified document describing covert CIA anti-terror operations in eighty countries in Asia, the Middle East, and Africa. The actions, underway or being recommended, would range from "routine propaganda to lethal covert action in preparation for military attacks," and the plans, if carried out, "would give the CIA the broadest and most lethal authority in its history."

Tenet said that the CIA's efforts had put it in a position to respond rapidly and effectively to the attacks, both in the "Afghan sanctuary" and in "ninety-two countries around the world".

At the Cabinet-level Principals Committee meeting on terrorism of September 4, 2001, Tenet warned of the dangers of a controversial or mistaken strike with an under-tested armed drone. After the meeting, the CIA resumed reconnaissance flights, the drones now being weapons-capable but as yet unarmed.

=== 2002 ===
Starting on September 11, the strategy was no longer steady escalation, but multiple attacks on multiple fronts. On November 5, 2002, newspapers reported that al-Qaeda operatives in a car travelling through Yemen had been killed by a missile launched from a CIA-controlled Predator drone (a medium-altitude, remote-controlled aircraft).

In 2004, the Australian Broadcasting Corporation's (ABC-TV) international affairs program "Foreign Correspondent" investigated this targeted killing and the involvement of then U.S. Ambassador as part of a special report titled "The Yemen Option". The report also examined the evolving tactics and countermeasures in dealing with Al Qaeda inspired attacks.

=== 2004 ===
In June 2004, the U.S. killed Nek Muhammad Wazir, a Taliban commander and al-Qaeda facilitator, in a Predator missile strike in South Waziristan, Pakistan.

=== 2005 ===
On May 15, 2005, it was reported that another of these drones had been used to assassinate al-Qaeda explosives expert Haitham al-Yemeni inside Pakistan.

In December 2005, Abu Hamza Rabia, an Egyptian who was reportedly al-Qaeda's third in command, was killed in a surprise drone attack in North Waziristan.

=== 2006 ===
On January 13, 2006, the CIA launched an airstrike on Damadola, a Pakistani village near the Afghan border, where they believed Ayman al-Zawahiri was located. The airstrike killed a number of civilians but not al-Zawahiri. The Pakistani government issued a protest against the US attack, which it considered violated its sovereignty.

=== 2008 ===
In January 2008, Abu Laith al-Libi, one of al-Qaeda's senior figures, was killed in a targeted killing Predator rocket attack in Pakistan. Some intelligence sources describe him as the number three leader of al-Qaeda.

In July 2008, Abu Khabab al-Masri, suspected leader of al-Qaeda's chemical and biological weapons efforts, was killed in an attack by U.S. drone-launched missiles on a house in South Waziristan in Pakistan.

In October 2008, Khalid Habib, the al-Qaeda regional operations commander in Afghanistan and Pakistan, was killed by a missile launched by a Predator in South Waziristan, Pakistan.

In November 2008, Rashid Rauf, a British/Pakistani suspected planner of a 2006 transatlantic aircraft plot, was killed by a missile launched from a U.S. drone in North Waziristan.

=== 2009 ===
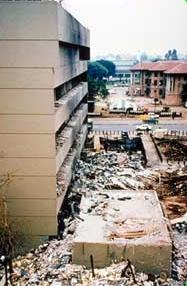
1998 U.S. embassy bombing in Kenya.

In January 2009, Usama al-Kini and Sheikh Ahmed Salim Swedan, alleged orchestrators of the 1998 United States embassy bombings in Kenya and Tanzania, were killed in a Predator strike in northern Pakistan. Later, in August 2009, Baitullah Mehsud, leader of the Tehrik-i-Taliban Pakistan, was killed in a U.S. drone missile attack in Waziristan.

==== Forward Operating Base Chapman attack ====
On December 30, 2009, a suicide attack occurred at Forward Operating Base Chapman, a major CIA base in the province of Khost, Afghanistan. Eight people, among them at least six CIA officers, including the chief of the base, were killed and six others seriously wounded in the attack. The attack was the second most deadly attack carried out against the CIA, after the 1983 United States Embassy bombing in Beirut, Lebanon, and was a major setback for the intelligence agency's operations.
