= Help the Needy (disambiguation) =

Help the Needy is an unregistered charity, based in Syracuse, New York, whose directors were convicted of violating the sanctions against sending funds to Iraq.

Help the Needy may also refer to:

- A song from the 1970 album Wilson Pickett in Philadelphia
- The motto of the Young Mizo Association

== See also ==
- "How to Help the Needy", an episode of How to Live with Your Parents (For the Rest of Your Life)
