= Kanan Makiya =

Iraqi-American professor and author

- Born: 1949 (age 76–77); Baghdad, Kingdom of Iraq
- Education: Massachusetts Institute of Technology

Kanan Makiya (born 1949) is an Iraqi-American academic and professor of Islamic and Middle Eastern Studies at Brandeis University. He gained international attention with Republic of Fear (1989), which became a best-selling book after Saddam Hussein's invasion of Kuwait, and with Cruelty and Silence (1991), a critique of the Arab intelligentsia. In 2003, Makiya lobbied the U.S. government to invade Iraq and oust Hussein.

Makiya was born in Baghdad and left Iraq to study architecture at the Massachusetts Institute of Technology, later working for his father's architectural firm, Makiya & Associates which had branch offices in London and across the Middle East. As a former exile, he was a prominent member of the Iraqi opposition, a "close friend" of Ahmed Chalabi, and an influential proponent of the Iraq War (2003–2011) effort. He subsequently admitted that effort "went wrong".

== Early life and education ==
Makiya was born in Baghdad in 1949, the son of Iraqi architect Mohamed Makiya and his English-born wife, Margaret Crawford, a school-teacher. Like his father, he studied architecture and worked for a time in the architectural and planning consultancy, Makiya & Associates, established by his father in the late 1940s.

Makiya began his political career as a Trotskyist and became closely identified with Christopher Hitchens and Stephen Schwartz. In 1967, Makiya left Iraq for the United States to attend the Massachusetts Institute of Technology and was unable to return to Iraq until the 2000s due to the subsequent rise of the Ba'athist regime there.

== Career ==
In 1981, Makiya left the practice of architecture to become an academic and author. He wrote under the pseudonym Samir al-Khalil to avoid endangering his family. In Republic of Fear (1989), which became a best-seller after Saddam Hussein's invasion of Kuwait, he argues that Iraq had become a full-fledged totalitarian state, worse than despotic states such as Jordan or Saudi Arabia. His next book, The Monument (1991), is an essay on the aesthetics of power and kitsch.

Regarding the 1990-1991 Gulf War, Makiya wrote, "For the Iraqi people, the cost of enforcing the will of the United Nations has been grotesque."

Cruelty and Silence: War, Tyranny, Uprising and the Arab World (1993) was published under Makiya's own name. It was awarded the Lionel Gelber Prize for the best book on international relations published in English in 1993. According to a 2007 profile of Makiya in The New York Times Magazine, the 1993 book "posed a devastating critique of the Arab world's intelligentsia, whose anti-Americanism, Makiya argued, had prompted it to conspire in a massive, collective silence over Hussein's dungeons."

In 2001 Makiya published The Rock: A Seventh Century Tale about Jerusalem, a work of historical fiction that tells the story of Muslim-Jewish relations in the formative first century of Islam, culminating in the building of the Dome of the Rock. Makiya also writes occasional columns and they have been published in The Independent and The New York Times.

Makiya has collaborated on many films for television, the most recent of which exposed for the first time the 1988 campaign of mass murder in northern Iraq known as the Anfal. The film was broadcast in the U.S. on the PBS program Frontline under the title Saddam's Killing Fields and received the Overseas Press Club's Edward Murrow Award in 1992. In 2002, Makiya also offered significant insights concerning the events of 9/11 in the PBS/Frontline documentary, "Faith & Doubt at Ground Zero."

In 1992 Makiya founded the Iraq Research and Documentation Project (IRDP), which was renamed the Iraq Memory Foundation in 2003. Makiya worked closely with Ayad Rahim in the early development of the IRDP. In October 1992, he convened the Human Rights Committee of the Iraqi National Congress, a transitional parliament based in northern Iraq. The Iraq Memory Foundation went on to receive $5.1 million in contracts from the Pentagon from 2004 to 2006 in order to publicize Saddam Hussein's atrocities as part of the U.S. war effort.

Makiya is widely known to have been a strong proponent of the 2003 Iraq War and advocated for the "complete dismantling of the security services of the regime, leaving only the regular police force intact". As U.S. forces took control during the 2003 Invasion of Iraq, Makiya returned to Iraq under their aegis and was given the position of Advisor to the Iraq interim governing council by the Coalition Provisional Authority. In an interview with Charlie Rose in late 2003, Makiya said he had "settled back" in Iraq and that he was "in it for the long run." However, in 2006 Makiya left Iraq and returned to teach at Brandeis University.

Makiya is quoted as having said, "As I told the President on January 10th, I think [the troops] will be greeted with sweets and flowers in the first months and simply have very, very little doubts that that is the case." His support for the war followed an idealistic line, as recounted in the New York Times Magazine in 2007:

In the buildup to the Iraq war, Makiya, more than any single figure, made the case for invading because it was the right thing to do - to destroy an evil regime and rescue a people from their nightmare of terror and suffering. Not for oil, Makiya argued, and not for some superweapons hidden in the sand, but to satisfy an obligation to our fellow human beings. If it sounded idealistic, Makiya went even further, arguing that an American invasion of Iraq could clear the ground for Western-style democracy. Years of war and murder had left Iraqis so thoroughly degraded, Makiya argued, that, once freed, they would throw off the tired orthodoxies of Arab politics and, in their despair, look to the West.

However, the article depicted Makiya expressing concern over the subsequent war, and comparing the number of Iraqi deaths since 2003 to deaths under the deposed ruler Saddam Hussein: "It's getting closer to Saddam." In the original 1986 draft of Republic of Fear, Makiya had referred to "the growth of confessionalism, family loyalties, ethnic hatred, and religious sectarianism in Iraqi society—which Ba'thism simultaneously inculcated and kept at bay" and predicted that in the event of a Ba'athist collapse in the Iran–Iraq War there was a "hidden potential for even more violence inside Iraq [which] could at some point in the future make the Lebanese civil war look like a family outing gone slightly sour."

== Criticism of Makiya ==
Edward Said, a professor of English at Columbia University, was a vocal critic of Makiya. Said contended that Makiya was a Trotskyist in the late 1960s and early 1970s, but that he later "switched sides," profiting by designing buildings for Saddam Hussein.

Said also asserted that Makiya mistranslated Arab intellectuals (including himself) so he could condemn them for not speaking out against the crimes of Arab rulers. Makiya had criticised Said for encouraging a sense of Muslim victimhood and offering inadequate censure to those in the Middle East who were themselves guilty of atrocities. Similar criticism about mistranslations was voiced by Michael W. Suleiman when reviewing Republic of Fear.

George Packer wrote in his book The Assassin's Gate that it was Makiya's father who worked for Saddam, but Makiya himself used those profits to fund his book Republic of Fear. Packer also noted Makiya's drift from radical to liberal to sudden alliance with American neoconservatives: "Look behind Kanan Makiya and you found Richard Perle, Paul Wolfowitz, Donald Rumsfeld."

Packer and many others have faulted him for his enthusiastic support for Ahmad Chalabi, "the most controversial exile of them all" and convicted felon. He championed Chalabi to the exclusion of a wider opposition network, resulting in the marginalizing of experienced figures like Feisal al-Istrabadi who supported a wider net.

Concluded journalist Christopher Lydon in 2007: "My friend Kanan Makiya was the most influential Iraqi advocate in America of the war to "liberate" his country five years ago. Today he is the most articulate casualty of his own fantasy." Lydon goes on to call Makiya "an idealist who stands for me as a warning about the dangerous misfit of idealism and military power. He's an example, I'm afraid, of what the French call the trahison des clercs; the treason of the intellectuals. He is a caution to us intellectuals and wannabes against the poison of very bad ideas — like the notion of transformation by conquest and humiliation.”

In a 2016 interview with NPR to promote his new novel, Makiya explores aloud what went wrong in Iraq and who is to blame: "I want to understand that it went wrong, and who I hold responsible for why it went wrong — including myself."

== Personal life ==
Makiya was formerly married to Afsaneh Najmabadi. He is an atheist.
