= Husham Al-Husainy =

Iraqi and Lebanese American Islamic figure

Husham Al-Husainy is an Iraqi-American Sheikh of the Karbalaa Islamic Education Center, a Shia mosque servicing largely people of Iraqi and Lebanese descent in Dearborn, Michigan. Al-Husainy arrived in the United States in the late 1970s as Saddam Hussein was rising into power. He is a spokesman of the Iraqi expatriate community in America. Al-Husainy is a prominent supporter of the U.S. invasion of Iraq in 2003. During the American occupation of Iraq, Al-Husainy went from supporting the toppling of Hussein's regime to criticizing the continued occupation as inciting more bloodshed.

== Karbaala Islamic Education Center ==
Imam Husham Al-Husainy has been active in community affairs for more than 25 years in the metro-Detroit area. He is the Director of the Karbalaa Islamic Education Center.

== Politics ==
Al-Husainy has cooperated with the United States on security measures for instance in a case where it has been alleged that Detroit area resident Najib Shemami was a spy. He railed in support of the 2003 invasion of Iraq, participated in pro-war rallies and met with Paul Wolfowitz at the Pentagon during the planning of the conflict. Al-Husainy came under controversy for praising Iran and its expansion into Lebanon, Syria, Iraq and Yemen.

Husainy was slated to deliver the first-ever benediction by a Muslim leader at a United States presidential inauguration at the second inauguration of Donald Trump on January 20, 2025, but did not attend.
