= Ayad Rahim =

Iraqi-American journalist

Ayad Rahim (Arabic: إياد رحيم) is an Iraqi-American journalist. He has written extensively on Middle Eastern affairs, including a series of articles on the Operation Iraqi Freedom Documents with co-author Laurie Mylroie. In addition, he hosts a radio show on station WJCU in Cleveland. His show features scholars and guests from the Middle East and discusses the war, terrorism and Iraq. The radio station is run by John Carroll University.

== Early life ==
Rahim was born in London on February 16, 1962. He lived in Baghdad with his family from 1965-1971. His father was a doctor who immigrated to the United States in 1970. In 1971, his family joined his father in Cleveland, Ohio. In college, Rahim studied history, political science and journalism.

== Career ==
In 1983-84, Rahim worked on Gary Hart's presidential campaign. From 1989-1991, Rahim worked for 18 months as a journalist in Jerusalem. While many Palestinians supported Saddam Hussein, Rahim did not. When Saddam invaded Kuwait, Rahim hoped only that Palestinians would benefit from the invasion and that as many American soldiers would die as possible. Rahim describes this as a very confusing time for him.

While in Jerusalem in October, 1990, Rahim met Kanan Makiya, the author of Republic of Fear, an important book on Baathist Iraq, published under a pseudonym in 1989. Rahim and Makiya would later work together. Rahim returned home to Cleveland in January, 1991, at the start of U.S. hostilities to remove Iraq from Kuwait.

In March, 1991, uprisings in Iraq against Saddam changed the political landscape. Iraqis around the world became less afraid to speak out against Saddam. In June, 1991, Rahim began working with Kanan Makiya. Rahim and Makiya later worked in association with the Iraq Research and Documentation Project, when it was launched, at Harvard in 1993. That project later grew into the Iraq Memory Foundation, a Baghdad-based project that seeks to develop a learning center similar to the Holocaust museum.

== Blogging in Baghdad ==
From April - July 2004, Rahim studied events in Iraq and wrote a daily blog from the Baghdad office of the Iraq Foundation Rahim also visited his family and wrote about their observations and outlook.

== Interviews ==
Rahim has interviewed a number of interesting guests on his radio program about the War on Terror, the Arab world, Islam, terrorism and Iraq. Guests have included:

• Dr. Fouad Ajami – Lebanese American scholar and writer discussed the historical, political, cultural and psychological background of the Arab world.

• Christopher Hitchens – discussed the left, today’s “anti-war” camps, anti-Semitism and other topics.

• Adeed Dawisha – native of Iraq and professor of political science at Miami University discussed the identity of Iraq, its status and chances for survival. He also discussed Iraq's democratic experience under the monarchy, the recent Iraqi elections and the forming of the new government.

• Michael Scharf – professor of law at Case Western Reserve University Law School who formerly worked for the UN and trained members of the Iraqi Special Court discussed Saddam’s trial, the fairness and independence of the tribunal and misreporting on the tribunal.

• Dr. Laurie Mylroie – discussed the bombing of the World Trade Center in 1993.

• George Will – discussed the doctrine of preemption.
