= Armand Nassery =

Iraqi-American author and filmmaker (born 1966)

- أرماند الناصري
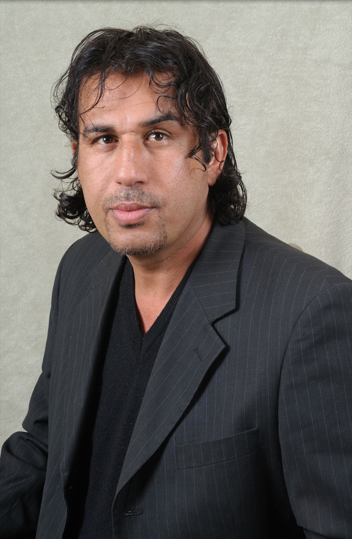
- Born: 1966; Iraq
- Died: 2017 (aged 50–51); Iraq
- Known for: Where wolves dream novel

Armand Nassery (Arabic:أرماند الناصري) was an Iraqi–American author and filmmaker, best known for his novel "where wolves dream". Armand who was born in 1966 in Iraq, he spent much of his adult life as a refugee in Saudi Arabia then the United states, but towards the end of his life he preferred to return to Iraq where he died on May 31, 2017.

== Biography ==
Armand Nassery is an independent filmmaker and Iraqi-American author. Armand was born near the Iraqi province of Dhi-Qar; one of eleven children. His family moved to the capital, Baghdad, when he was young in search of an improved life. He spent his early years of school reading history, literature, poetry and was fascinated with his English language class. In the early eighties, Armand's family was forced to move back south because of being labeled disloyal to the ruling Ba'ath Party. His family soon settled in a small southern town, which became the setting of his novel. In high school Armand joined the school theater group. He wrote and directed most of the plays with the help of one of his brothers. In college, Armand met some students who opposed the oppressive dictatorship of Saddam Hussein; some of the students were members of opposition parties. The ruthless Iraqi secret police Al-Amen arrested him on the final day of his last year. The charges were for writing poetry that was considered disrespectful to the Iraqi dictator Saddam Hussein. This charge held the penalty of death. Armand spent two months in the dim airless Al-Amen dungeons enduring continuous torture and interrogation. His conditions for release were that he would never again write poetry or join any forbidden political party. Armand and his brothers joined the uprising against the regime of Saddam Hussein in March 1991 after the Gulf War. In this ill-fated armed struggle for freedom he frequently stared death in the face. When the last southern town fell to the brutal suppressive Ba’ath forces Armand fled to avoid certain torture and death. He was tried and sentenced in absentia. The sentence was death. He spent three grueling days in the desert of Iraq and was able to reach Saudi Arabia with the aid of the American 82nd Airborne Soldiers. Upon reaching Saudi Arabia the Americans were required to turn him over to the authorities of Saudi Arabia. He was again imprisoned and spent six months being tortured for crossing the borders illegally. Then in 1992 Armand was able to immigrate to the safety of the United States. He has spent the last two decades living in California and the Midwest. Many of his personal experiences have been the inspiration of his fictional novel Where Wolves Dream

== Books ==
Where Wolves Dream (a novel) In the mystical setting of the fictional town of Balluria, Iraq, Salam and his best friend Hamid spend their days together with their peers of young boys and girls listening to mesmerizing stories, legends and myths told by a childless and mysterious gypsy, Barrya. Acting as a surrogate mother for the local children, Barrya reveals the secrets of the mystic town. As young teenagers, Salam, Hamid, and Hamid's sister Amel form a special bond through poetry and love songs, but the relationship is not strong enough to keep Salam in Balluria. At the age of 17, he leaves for America to study medicine. In America, Salam turns his back on his old life, family, and history to start anew. Even as the Gulf War and the long years of the harsh embargo tear the lives of his family and friends apart, he ignores their letters. Salam marries and becomes a successful artist, acting as if his life in Balluria never happened, until the events of 9/11, the War on Terror and later the invasion of Iraq sends his world spiraling downward. He opens the old letters and begins to relive the past.
Salam returns to Iraq after 2003, hoping to come to peace with his past and the family he left behind. He finds a mirage of Barrya, who attempts to heal him by revealing secrets hidden in the history of his homeland. The man who never felt quite a part of either country, or understood his existence as a citizen of two countries and two worlds, learns to be comfortable with himself while coming to terms with his past and starting to believe and see the hope in the future. Nassery hopes that his novel reflects Iraq's past and present realistically while providing readers with a glimpse of what life is like for immigrants in the United States. He depicts the struggle between desires to start a new life and the memories of a painful past and history of a country long held in the darkness of war and violence.

== Filmography ==
Hotel Baquba a documentary that Nassery has been working on since 2006. The film covers the sectarian violence that erupted in Iraq from 2003 till 2010. The film is planned to be produced in 2013.

Children of Sader is a documentary film about the new generation of armed children and teenagers in Iraq who follow the "New Iraq" clergymen and execute their orders and fatwas with no questions asked. The film is to be released in 2013.

== Television series ==
Hikayat Jameeya (English: A University Tale) a TV Series that aired and still airing in Iraq TV channels, Dijla and Al-Iraqia TV channels. The series is directed by Aleem Taher and produced by The New Civilization Production company. Armand Nassery wrote screenplays, synopsis, co-directed and co-produced many of the episodes of seasons one, two, and three.
Al-Sayadoon (English: The Hunters) a TV Series that aired and still airing in Iraq TV channels, Dijla and Al-Iraqia TV channels. The series is directed by Aleem Taher and produced by The New Civilization Production company. Armand Nassery wrote screenplays, synopsis, co-directed and co-produced many of the episodes of seasons one, two, and three.

== See also ==
- List of Iraqis
- List of Iraqi Americans
