= Financial intelligence =

Intelligence assessment of accounting and financial transactions

Financial intelligence (FININT) is the gathering of information about the financial affairs of entities of interest, to understand their nature and capabilities, and predict their intentions. Generally the term applies in the context of law enforcement and related activities. One of the main purposes of financial intelligence is to identify financial transactions that may involve tax evasion, money laundering or some other criminal activity. FININT may also be involved in identifying financing of criminal and terrorist organisations. Financial intelligence can be broken down into two main areas, collection and analysis. Collection is normally done by a government agency, known as a financial intelligence organisation or Financial Intelligence Unit (FIU). The agency will collect raw transactional information and Suspicious activity reports (SAR) usually provided by banks and other entities as part of regulatory requirements. Data may be shared with other countries through intergovernmental networks. Analysis, may consist of scrutinizing a large volume of transactional data using data mining or data-matching techniques to identify persons potentially engaged in a particular activity. SARs can also be scrutinized and linked with other data to try to identify specific activity.

== Collection ==
FININT involves scrutinizing a large volume of transactional data, usually provided by banks and other entities as part of regulatory requirements. Alternatively, data mining or data-matching techniques may be employed to identify persons potentially engaged in a particular activity. Many industrialized countries have regulatory reporting requirements for its financial organisations. It may be possible for the FININT organization to obtain access to raw data at a financial organization. From a legal standpoint, this type of collection can be quite complex. For example, the CIA obtained access to the Society for Worldwide Interbank Financial Telecommunication (SWIFT) data streams through the Terrorist Finance Tracking Program, but this violated Belgian privacy law. Reporting requirements may not affect Informal value transfer systems (IVTS) the use of which may simply be customary in a culture, and of amounts that would not require reporting if in a conventional financial institution. IVTS also can be used for criminal purposes of avoiding oversight.

== Analysis ==
Examples of financial intelligence analysis could include:

- Identifying high-risk housing tenants on the basis of past rental histories.
- Detecting tax payers trying to avoid their fiduciary obligations by moving wealth surreptitiously out of a tax-levying jurisdiction.
- Discovering safe havens where criminals park the proceeds of crime.
- Accounting for how a large sum of money handed to a targeted individual disappears
- Checking to see if a corrupt individual has had any sudden and unexplained windfalls.
- Detecting relationships between terrorist cells through remittances.

== In the United States ==
At the highest level, US domestic FININT, and also some international work, comes under the Under Secretary of the Treasury for Terrorism and Financial Intelligence, heading the Office of Terrorism and Financial Analysis, including:

- Financial Crimes Enforcement Network
- Office of Foreign Assets Control
- Office of Intelligence and Analysis

International financial activity comes primarily from the Department of the Treasury and the Central Intelligence Agency. See CIA access to the Society for Worldwide Interbank Financial Telecommunication (SWIFT).

== Terrorist financing scenarios ==
=== Gems as an untraceable currency and source of income for terrorists ===
Following the September 11, 2001 attacks an allegation was made in The Wall Street Journal that tanzanite stones were being used as an untraceable currency and source of income for terrorists. This has not since been firmly established. See possible examples.

The custom common in Africa, uncut diamonds tend to be the de facto standard currency of the illicit small arms trade. Diamonds may be easily counted with a uniform valuation per carat to people in places of the world where there are no automated teller machines. An entire briefcase filled with uncut diamonds without the serial numbers found on refined precious metals can be used to make large illicit value transfers. The practice coexists with human trafficking, narcotics, weapons dealing, terrorism, and the evasion of economic sanctions and embargoes.

However, the Internal Revenue Service has since instituted new anti–money laundering regulations to control the gem trade.

=== Front-running the market in a terrorist attack ===
Another intriguing possibility is that a terrorist might buy stocks which are likely to appreciate in the event of a terrorist attack, such as defense industry stocks, or sell short stocks which are likely to depreciate, such as airlines. This possibility led to many investigations of the financial markets subsequent to the September 11, 2001 attacks.

== Further sources ==
- Georgios A. Antonopoulos; Marc Groenhuijsen; Jackie Harvey; Tijs Kooijmans; Almir Maljevic; Klaus Von Lampe (2011). Usual and Unusual Organising Criminals in Europe and Beyond: Profitable Crimes, from Underworld to Upper World: Liber Amicorum Petrus Van Duyne. Netherlands: Maklu. p. 100. ISBN 978-90-466-0429-8.
- "What is an FIU?". Archived from the original on 3 June 2012.
- "Fundings". European Commission. European Commission - DG Home Affairs (HOME).
- Money laundering and the financing of terrorism: 19th report of session 2008-09, Vol. 2: Evidence. United Kingdom: UK- Parliament; House of Lords - The Stationery Office. 2009. pp. 254–255. ISBN 9780108444692.
- fiu.net
