= Karbalaa Islamic Education Center =

Religious museum in the United States

Coordinates: 42.34393°N 83.19486°W

The Karbalaa Islamic Education Center is located in Dearborn, a suburb of Detroit. Housed in a former establishment that had been damaged by fire, the center contains approximately 10,000 square feet (930 m^{2}) of space that have been converted into a prayer room, offices, an all-purpose meeting room, an audio-visual room, kitchen, and an area to hold a weekend school for children.

== Membership and history ==
Those affiliated with the center are largely of Iraqi and Lebanese Shia descent, both recent immigrants and individuals who have been in the country for a considerable period of time. Much of the Iraqi community in Detroit was formed as individuals and families (Iraqi Americans) sought refuge from Saddam Hussein following the Gulf War. One of the founders of the Karbalaa Islamic Education Center, Imam Husham Alhusainy, arrived in the late 1970s, but did not start the Karbalaa Center until 1994. He and others bought space for the mosque, which presently has approximately 150–200 people affiliated with it.

== Activities ==
There are prayer services daily in the evening, and on Fridays at noon and in the evening. Other activities at the center include women's meetings, which are held in conjunction with similar woman's groups from other nearby mosques, including the Islamic Center of America, and the Islamic Institute of Knowledge. The center sponsors occasional religious discussions, "Meeting for Better Understanding," at which times Christians and Muslims come together to exchange ideas on different topics from the two groups' perspectives in order to promote understanding and tolerance. Discussion topics have included the unity of God, the nature of sin and morality, and the truth of Bible and the Qur'an. The Karbalaa Education Center sponsors a weekend school for children with classes in Arabic, the Qur'an, and Arabic culture and history.

== In the community ==
There is a museum dedicated to Islam, and a library with books and newspapers in Arabic. The center serves a vital function in the community by sponsoring Iraqi refugees and helping these new arrivals to adjust to life in the United States and become oriented to the Detroit community. In addition, it provides a link to other mosques in the area, thereby keeping the community tightly knit and reinforcing Middle Eastern culture.
