= Rafil A. Dhafir =

American Iraqi-born physician

Rafil A. Dhafir is an American Iraqi-born physician, who was sentenced on October 28, 2005, to 22 years in prison for violating sanctions placed against Iraq by sending money to Iraq through his charity program Help the Needy, as well as fraud, money laundering, tax evasion, and a variety of other crimes. Five other people, including his wife, had already pleaded guilty to charges in connection with the case.

Following his arrest, in February 2003, both Attorney General John Ashcroft and New York Governor George Pataki characterized Dhafir as a "suspected terrorist," a claim the federal government did not pursue.

An appeal was filed to the United States Court of Appeals for the Second Circuit. Oral arguments were presented on August 28, 2008. Ruling almost a year later, on August 18, 2009, the court of appeals upheld Dhafir's convictions but vacated his sentence and remanded to the district court for resentencing.

Dhafir was released on May 15, 2020.
