= Laurie Mylroie =

American political scientist and writer (born 1953)

- Born: July 23, 1953 (age 73); United States
- Education: Harvard University; Cornell University
- Occupation: Author
- Writing career
- Genre: Non-fiction
- Subjects: Iraq; War on terror
- Website: www.lauriemylroie.com

Laurie Mylroie (born July 22, 1953) is an American author and analyst who has written extensively on Iraq and the war on terror. The National Interest first published this work in an article entitled, "The World Trade Center Bombing: Who is Ramzi Yousef? And Why it Matters." In her book Study of Revenge (2000), Mylroie laid out her argument that the Iraqi regime under Saddam Hussein had sponsored the 1993 World Trade Center bombing and subsequent terrorist attacks. She claimed those attacks were part of an ongoing war that Saddam waged against America following the cease-fire to the 1991 Gulf War. Less than a year after her book was published, the September 11 attacks occurred. Mylroie subsequently adopted the view that Saddam had been responsible for the attacks, defending it on many occasions, including before the 9/11 Commission.

Mylroie's writings are considered to have been influential among neoconservatives during the buildup to the 2003 invasion of Iraq. Several of them praised Study of Revenge, including ex-CIA Director James Woolsey, who called it "brilliant and brave" in his blurb for the dust jacket of the book.

Mylroie has been criticized by numerous terrorism experts, including Peter Bergen, Daniel Benjamin, Richard Clarke and Dr. Robert S. Leiken, all of whom point out that Mylroie's theories rely on dubious assumptions and were thoroughly refuted by analysts and investigators at the CIA, the FBI, the NTSB, and other investigatory bodies.

== Career ==
Mylroie earned a bachelor's degree from Cornell University and a doctorate in political science from Harvard University. She also studied Arabic at the American University of Cairo. Subsequently, she taught as an assistant professor at Harvard University in the Department of Government (Political Science), Faculty of Arts and Science, and then as an associate professor in the Strategy and Policy Department of the U.S. Naval War College.

She met with Bill Clinton on Iraq during Clinton's 1992 presidential campaign, but she became a strong critic of Clinton for what she came to charge was his mishandling of the terrorism that began on his watch, starting with the February 26, 1993, bombing of New York's World Trade Center.

Mylroie was a research fellow at The Washington Institute for Near East Policy and then with the Foreign Policy Research Institute, as well as an adjunct fellow at the American Enterprise Institute. Following the 9/11 attacks, she served on DARPA's Special Task Force on Terrorism and Deterrence and a DTRA panel on counter-terrorism. She deployed to Iraq and Afghanistan, where she served as a cultural adviser to the U.S. military. She has written three books and numerous articles, which have appeared in The American Spectator, Atlantic Monthly, Boston Globe, Commentary, The National Interest, The New Republic, Newsweek, New York Times, Wall Street Journal, Washington Post, and Washington Times, among others.

== Iraq connection claims ==
Mylroie's suspicions that Iraq was behind the World Trade Center bombing first appeared at length in an article in The National Interest, "The World Trade Center Bomb: Who is Ramzi Yousef? And Why it Matters."

Her National Interest article appeared in expanded form in Study of Revenge: Saddam Hussein's Unfinished War Against America (2000). Mylroie later claimed that "the Clinton White House did not want to hear that Iraq was behind the bombing." Mylroie also argued that Iraq was linked to the 1995 Oklahoma City bombing.

== Support ==
Paul Wolfowitz, a prominent neoconservative, promoted Mylroie's theories during his time as a Bush administration official. Joseph Shattan, a former speechwriter for George W. Bush, called Mylroie "one of America's leading students of terrorism."

The Washington Post's "Book World" included Study of Revenge among its "Expert's Picks" following the 9/11 attacks.

The Middle East Intelligence Bulletin, reviewing Study of Revenge before 9/11, called it a "must read," explaining, "This reviewer believes that Mylroie has correctly pinpointed Saddam Hussein as the source of terrorist attacks on Americans, including the World Trade Center bombing.... The Clinton administration, wittingly or unwittingly, has chosen the path of self-delusion: to not investigate the matter seriously....[T]he failure of U.S. officials to address the question of state sponsorship of terrorism will have significant future costs. It encourages future terrorist attacks by eliminating the costs of retribution from the calculations of leaders such as Saddam Hussein."

== Criticism ==
Mylroie has been criticized by many terrorism experts. CNN reporter Peter Bergen called Mylroie a "crackpot" and criticized her belief that "Saddam was not only behind the '93 Trade Center attack, but also every anti-American terrorist incident of the past decade, from the bombings of U.S. embassies in Kenya and Tanzania to the leveling of the federal building in Oklahoma City to September 11 itself." Bergen states that Mylroie's argument depends entirely on

a deduction which she reached following an examination of Basit's passport records and her discovery that Yousef and Basit were four inches different in height. On this wafer-thin foundation she builds her case that Yousef must have therefore been an Iraqi agent given access to Basit's passport following the Iraq occupation. However, U.S. investigators say that 'Yousef' and Basit are in fact one and the same person, and that the man Mylroie describes as an Iraqi agent is in fact a Pakistani with ties to al Qaeda.

Bergen goes on to state that "an avalanche of evidence" refutes Mylroie's basic assumption.

Daniel Benjamin, a former Clinton administration official and senior fellow at the Center for Strategic and International Studies, points out that "Mylroie's work has been carefully investigated by the CIA and the FBI.... The most knowledgeable analysts and investigators at the CIA and at the FBI believe that their work conclusively disproves Mylroie's claims.... Nonetheless, she has remained a star in the neoconservative firmament."

Daniel Pipes derided her view, saying that it was "a tour de force, but it's a tour de force of alchemy. It has a fundamentally wrong premise." According to Andrew C. McCarthy, who prosecuted Sheik Omar Abdel Rahman in 1995, "Mylroie's theory was loopy... Leaving aside various other implausibilities in her surmise, the government had several sources who knew Basit as Basit both before and after the time he spent in Kuwait."

David Plotz is also among Mylroie's critics. He writes:

"The sharpest critique of Mylroie is that she discounts evidence that Yousef worked not for Iraq but for Osama Bin Laden... Bin Laden biographer Yossef Bodansky, Time magazine, and other media outlets concur that Ramzi Yousef worked for a Bin Laden-funded operation in the Philippines. So does American intelligence, apparently... Mylroie offers no real evidence linking Hussein to the 1998 bombings. Mylroie's strongest contention, that Ramzi Yousef is not Abdul Basit, does not confirm that Iraq bombed the World Trade Center in 1993. It just confirms that Ramzi Yousef is more mysterious than we suspect. It could still be that al-Qaida, not Hussein, provided Yousef with training, fake papers, and resources."

While Angelo Codevilla, professor emeritus of international relations at Boston University, called Mylroie's book Bush vs. the Beltway "the best available account of the reasoning behind the conduct of the war on terror", he also stated "But it is based on a faulty premise, the one implicit in its title: that presidents neither control nor reform their bureaucracies... If all presidents are equally beset by bureaucrats, then Bush can be excused, even praised, for making U.S. policy come out no worse than it has."

== Mylroie–McCarthy debate ==
In 2008, Laurie Mylroie, writing in the New York Sun, reviewed Willful Blindness by Andrew C. McCarthy, who had prosecuted Sheik Omar Abdel Rahman in 1995. Mylroie explained that Rahman had not ordered the bombing of the World Trade Center—nor was he charged with doing so. She also explained that other elements of the plot had been organized by Sudan, as the trial transcript made clear. She complained that McCarthy understated "the degree to which the extremists were penetrated by the intelligence agencies of several states." She argued that this was the basic flaw of the Clinton era handling of terrorism: it focused on the arrest and trial of perps and ignored state sponsorship.

Replying on National Review Online, McCarthy accused Mylroie of misunderstanding "the difference between intrigue and evidence, between history and prosecution." Calling Rahman "the central figure in the overarching conspiracy," he wrote: "At trial, we proved that Sheikh Abdel Rahman had close ties to Hassan al-Turabi, leader in the early 1990s of Sudan's de facto government, the National Islamic Front." At this point, Daniel Pipes wrote a blog entry attacking "Laurie Mylroie's Shoddy, Loopy, Zany Theories." Stephen F. Hayes of The Weekly Standard added: "no one I know took her arguments very seriously."

Mylroie responded to McCarthy, saying that McCarthy himself had written in his book that the original case against Rahman was "weak" and so, she wrote, "different acts of violence, including the WTC bombing, were somewhat artificially linked" to strengthen the charges against him. She emphasized McCarthy's comment that Rahman was never charged with the "substantive crime" of bombing the World Trade Center. The debate continued in the New York Sun.

== 1980s support for Saddam ==
Early in her career, Mylroie advocated support for Iraq in the context of its war and rivalry with Iran. In 1988, just before the cease-fire to the Iran–Iraq War, she published an article in the journal Orbis, advocating "The Baghdad Alternative," which involved bolstering U.S. ties to Iraqi dictator Saddam Hussein. Ken Silverstein gave this summary:

Saddam was implementing a policy of economic "perestroika" and political "glasnost," according to Mylroie. Iraqi officials she interviewed told her that Saddam was "much concerned about democracy. ... He thinks that is healthy," and she suggested this was "not just idle chatter." From an American perspective, Mylroie concluded, "the more Saddam Hussein exercises control over the Baath Party, including the ideologues, the better." She proposed that the Bush (Senior) Administration, already favoring Iraq against Iran, should offer Iraq more support in exchange for overt Iraqi support for U.S. Middle East policy goals. "Iraq and the United States," she wrote, "need each other."

Michael Isikoff and David Corn wrote in 2006:

Mylroie continued to advocate engaging Saddam, even after the Iraqi dictator slaughtered tens of thousands of Kurds in what became known as the Anfal campaign of 1987 and 1988. In May 1989, Mylroie wrote in The Jerusalem Post that Israel and the United States should not 'poke' Iraq 'with a stick' and should refrain from tossing 'idle threats and harsh words' at Baghdad. She suggested Iraq might become a benign, if not positive, presence in the region.

Isikoff and Corn argued that Mylroie "was looking to change the region through back-channel, private diplomacy – and she aspired to be a behind-the-scenes peacemaker who would broker a deal between Saddam and Israel." To this end, she met with Iraqi officials including Tariq Aziz. After Saddam's invasion of Kuwait, however, the would-be diplomat "turned against the dictator she had once wanted Washington to help, with the passion of one who felt personally betrayed."

In October 1990, Egyptian President Hosni Mubarak mentioned Mylroie's trips to Baghdad and Israel, which she later denied. Isikoff and Corn, however, interviewed five of her former associates (including Judith Miller) who all "confirmed that she had been a secret go-between for Baghdad and Jerusalem."

== Books ==
- Saddam Hussein & the Crisis in the Gulf (with Judith Miller). Random House (1990). ISBN 0-09-989860-8
- Study of Revenge: Saddam Hussein's Unfinished War Against America. The AEI Press (2000). ISBN 0-8447-4127-2
- Bush vs. the Beltway: The Inside Battle over War in Iraq. Harper Collins (ReganBooks) (2004). ISBN 0-06-059726-7
