= History of metallurgy in China =

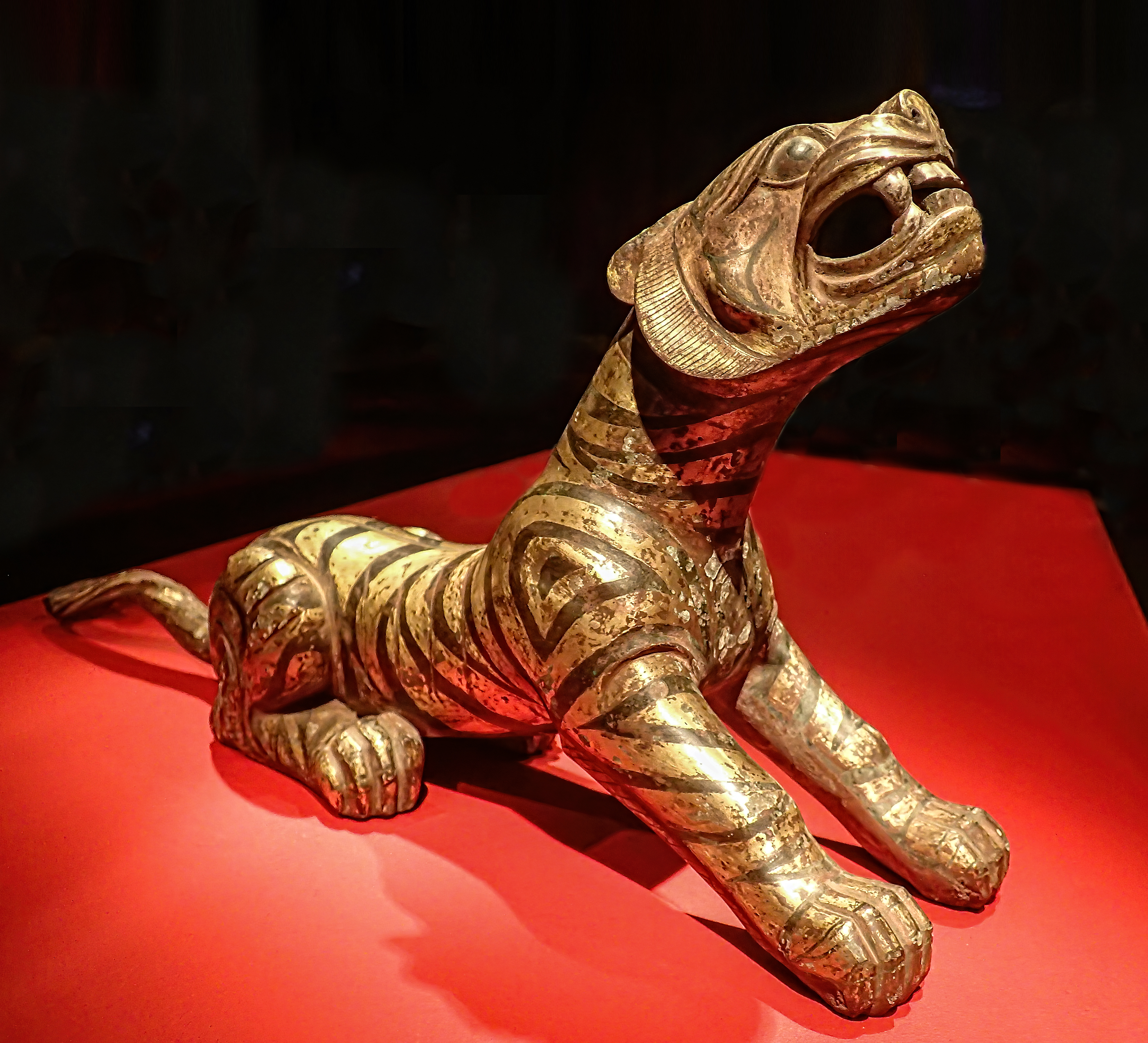
Bronze tiger inlaid with gold and silver, Han dynasty

Metallurgy in China has a long history, with the earliest metal objects in China dating back to around 2,900 BC. The majority of early metal items found in China come from the northwestern region (mainly Gansu and Qinghai). China was the earliest civilization to use the blast furnace and produce cast iron.

== Copper & Bronze ==
A knife from the Majiayao culture found in Linjia, Gansu dated to between 2900 to 2740 BC is earliest copper alloy artifact of 'secure stratigraphic provenience' from China. However, a 2016 journal article concluded from the isotopes, lack of nearby ore deposits, and lack of associated smelting site that the dagger was most likely imported.

By the late third millennium BC established centers of copper and bronze metallurgy had emerged in northwest China associated with the Zongri (2500 BC), Machang (2300 BC), and Qijia (2300 BC) archeological sites. From around 2000 BC, cast bronze objects such as the socketed spear with single side hook were imported and adapted from the Seima-Turbino culture.

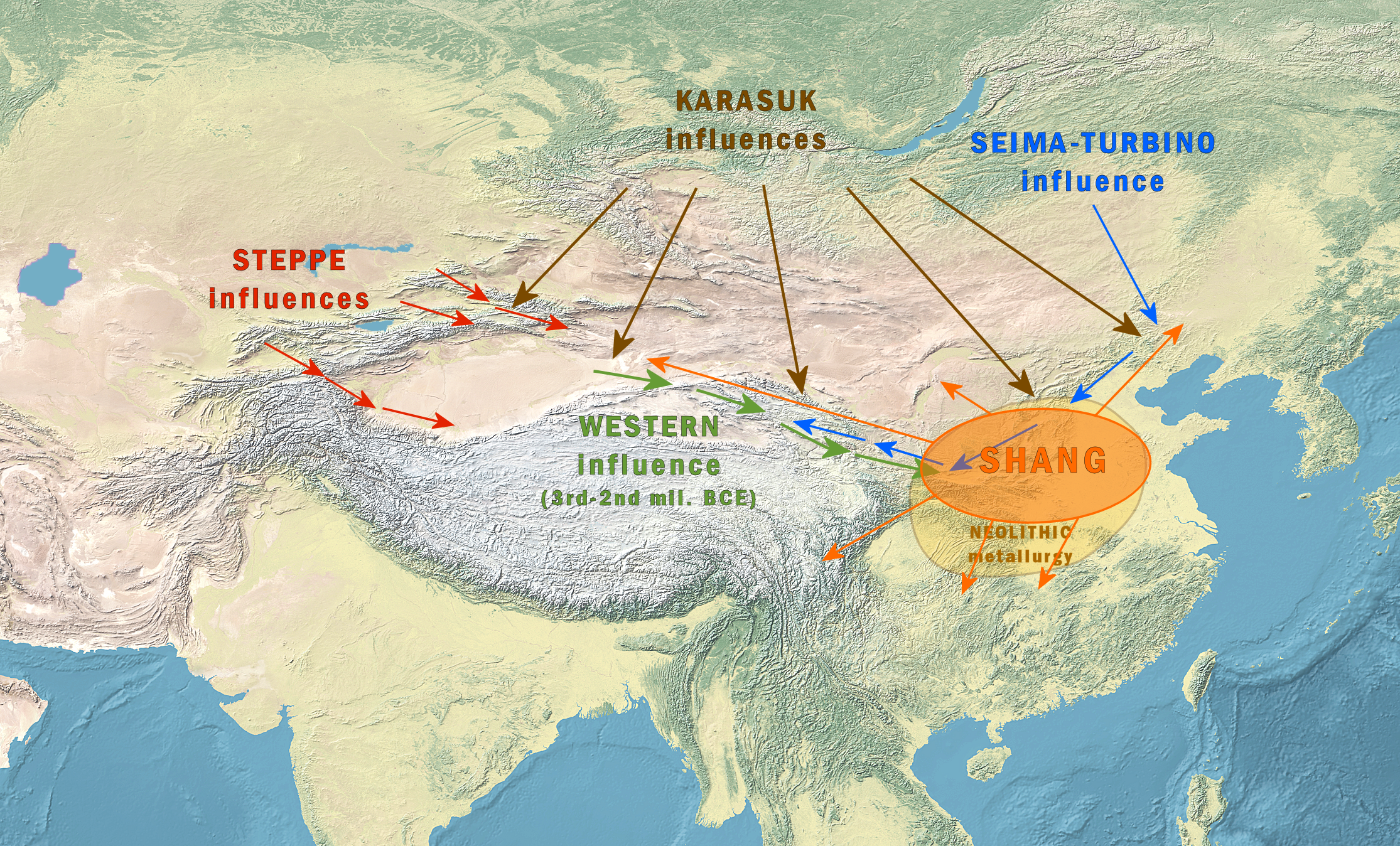
Historical influences on Chinese metallurgy. After a small early copper industry in the Neolithic, China was influenced by the metallurgy of the steppes (Andronovo culture), the Seima-Turbino phenomenon and the Karasuk culture down to the Shang dynasty period.

Contacts between the Afanasievo culture and the Majiayao and Qijia cultures have been considered for the transmission of bronze technology. The production at Erlitou sitesrepresents the earliest large scale metallurgy in the Central Plains of China.

At Dengjiawan, in the Shijiahe site complex in Hubei, some pieces of copper were discovered; they are the earliest copper objects discovered in southern China.

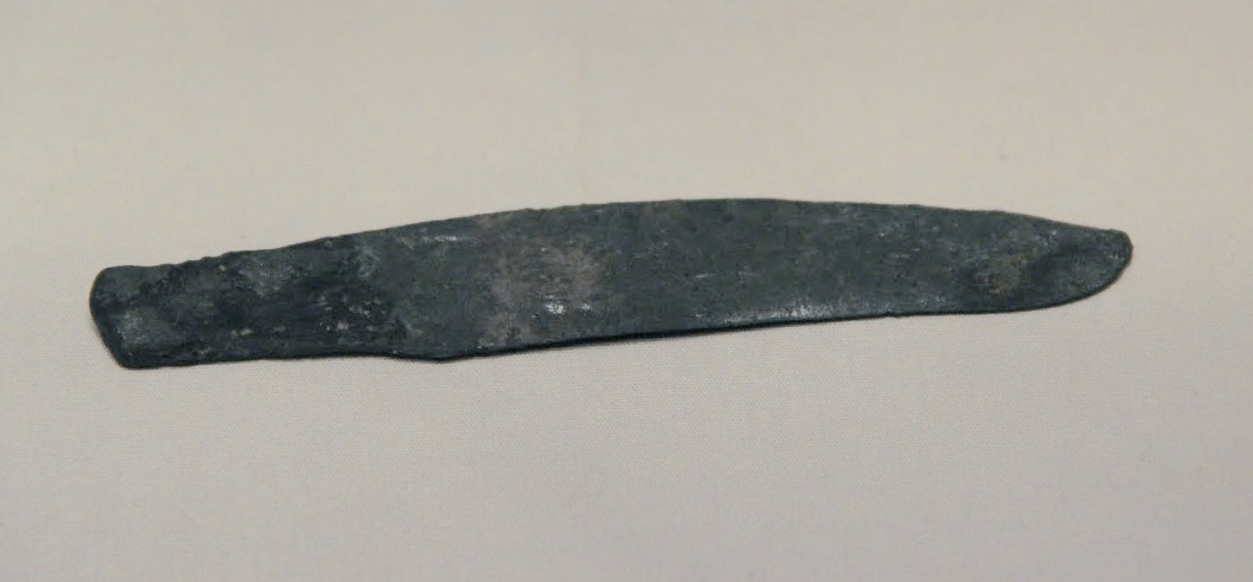
Bronze knife found in Dongxiang, Gansu (dated 2900–2740 BC), Majiayao culture

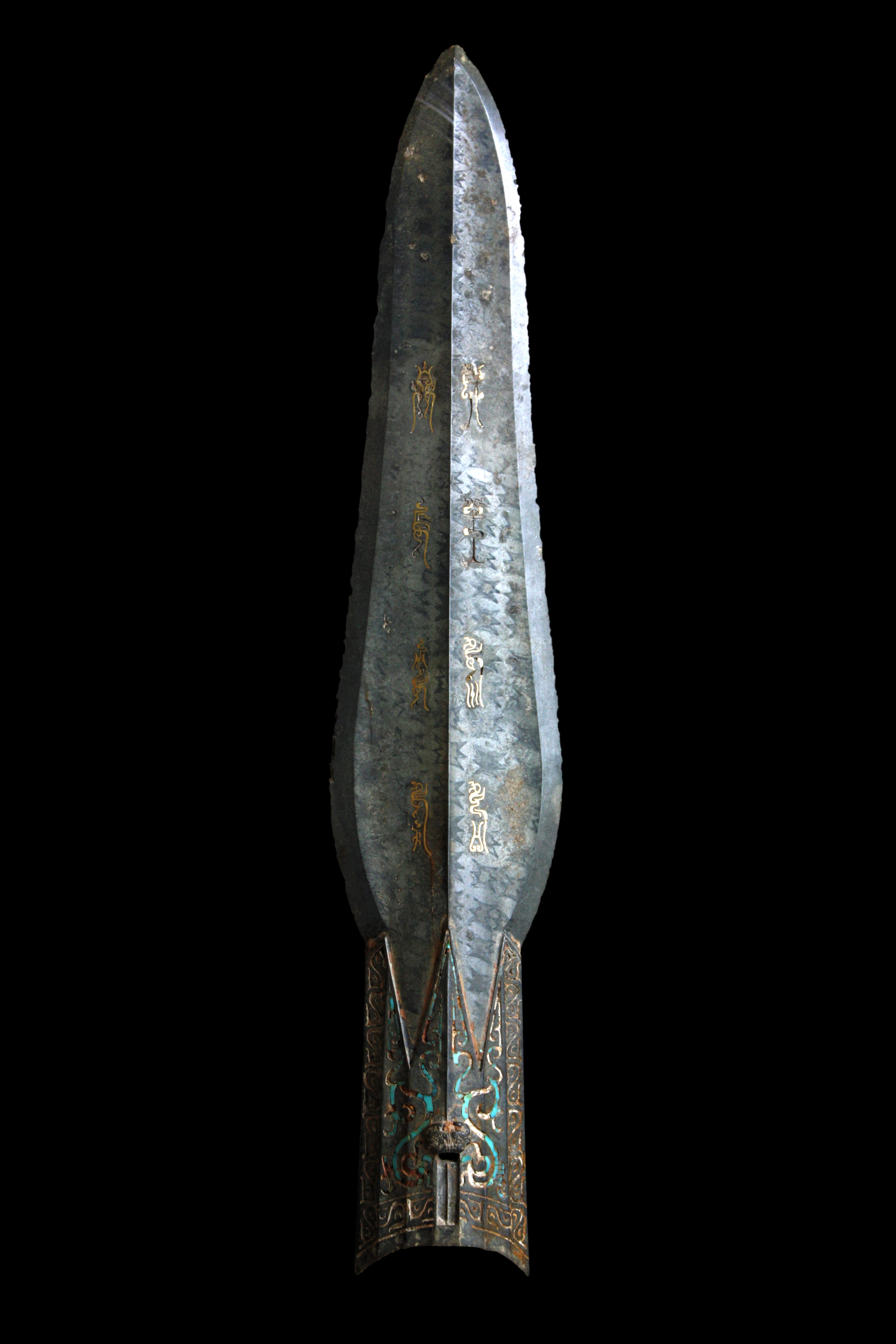
Bronze spearhead with inscription, Zhou dynasty

The Erlitou culture, Shang dynasty, and Sanxingdui cultures of early China used bronze vessels for rituals (see Chinese ritual bronzes) as well as farming implements and weapons. By 1500 BC, excellent bronzes were being made in China in large quantities, partly as a display of status, and as many as 200 large pieces were buried with their owner for use in the afterlife, as in the Tomb of Fu Hao, a Shang queen.

In the tomb of the first Qin Emperor and multiple Warring States period tombs, extremely sharp swords and other weapons were found, coated with chromium oxide, which made the weapons rust resistant. The layer of chromium oxide used on these swords was 10 to 15 micrometers and left them in pristine condition to this day. Chromium was first scientifically attested in the 18th century. During the Warring States period, bronze-working traditions in southern China produced increasingly elaborate weapons and decorative objects, including gilt-bronze swords.

=== Section-mold casting ===
There are two types of bronze smelting techniques in early China, namely the section mold process and the lost-wax process. The earliest bronze ware found in China is the bronze knife (F20: 18) unearthed at the Majiayao in Linjia, Dongxiang, Gansu, and dated to about 3000 BC. This bronze knife uses the section mold process, which is spliced by two molds.

The section mold process is a commonly used bronze casting method in the Shang dynasty, that is, the mud is selected, and after selecting, filtration, showering, deposition and other procedures, the mud is cooled to a moderate hardness as a backup, and then the mud is made according to the shape of the vessel to be made. There are two types of molds, which is inner mold and outer mold. The inner mold is only the shape of the bronze ware, without decoration; the outer model should consider the division of the bronze ware after casting in the future, that is, the block during the production of the clay model, and also engrave the inscriptions and inscriptions of the bronze ware decoration on the clay model. After the clay mold are done, put it in a cool place to dry in the shade, and then put it into the furnace for roasting. After the mold are heated, they become pottery molds unearthed during modern archaeological discoveries. After the pottery mold is fired, do not rush out of the furnace. After the copper furnace has liquefied the required copper, the pottery mold that still has residual temperature is taken out and poured. In this way, the temperature difference between the copper liquid and the pottery mold is not large, and the pottery mold is not easy to burst. The quality of the finished product is relatively high. After the copper liquid is poured, remove the pottery molds and molds according to the blocks they were made. If they can't be removed, they can be broken with a hammer. The bronze will come out, and after grinding, it is the finished product.

=== Lost-wax casting ===
According to some scholars, lost-wax casting was used in China already during the Spring and Autumn period (c. 770–476 BC), although this is often disputed.

The lost-wax method is used in most parts of the world. As the name suggests, the lost-wax method is to use wax as a mold, and heat it to melt the wax mold and lose it, thereby casting bronze ware, making the model (the outer layer of the wax model is coated with mud), lost-wax (heating to make the wax flow out), pouring copper liquid to fill the cavity left by the wax model, etc. The development and spread of the lost-wax method in the West has never stopped, but the main bronze casting method in the Bronze Age in China is the section mold process. When the lost-wax method was introduced into China is also a topic of academic discussion. In 1978, the Bronze Zun-Pan unearthed from the tomb of Marquis Yi of Zeng in Leigudun, Suixian County, Hubei Province, used a mixed process of section mold method and lost-wax method.

== Iron ==
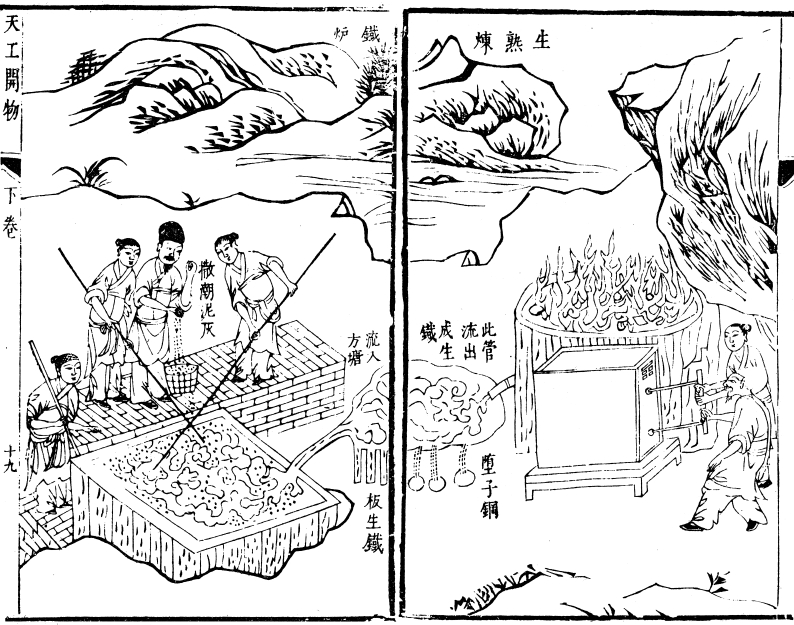
A Chinese blast furnace, pouring out iron

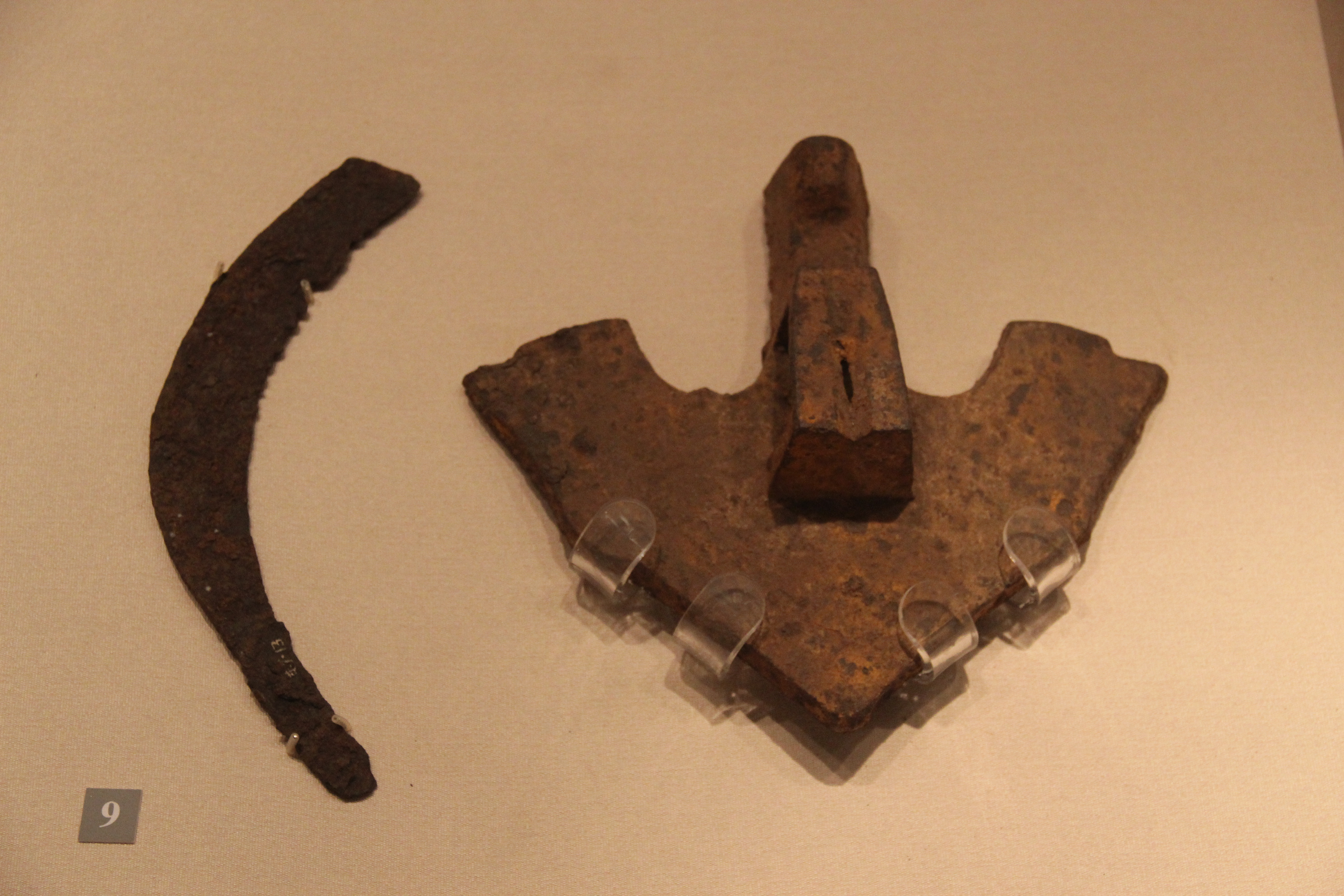
Iron sickle and plow, Han dynasty

=== Introduction ===
The early Iron Age in China began before 1000 BC, with the introduction of ironware, such as knives, swords, and arrowheads, from the west into Xinjiang, before it further diffused to Qinghai and Gansu. In 2008, two iron fragments were excavated at the Mogou site, in Gansu. They have been dated to the 14th century BC, belonging to the period of Siwa culture. One of the fragments was made of bloomery iron rather than meteoritic iron.

=== Cast iron ===
Cast iron farm tools and weapons were widespread in China by the 5th century BC, employing workforces of over 200 men in iron smelters from the 3rd century onward. The earliest known blast furnaces are attributed to the Han dynasty in the 1st century AD. These early furnaces had clay walls and used phosphorus-containing minerals as a flux. Chinese blast furnaces ranged from around two to ten meters in height, depending on the region. The largest ones were found in modern Sichuan and Guangdong, while the 'dwarf" blast furnaces were found in Dabieshan. In construction, they are both around the same level of technological sophistication

There is no evidence of the bloomery in China after the appearance of the blast furnace and cast iron. In China, blast furnaces produced cast iron, which was then either converted into finished implements in a cupola furnace, or turned into wrought iron in a fining hearth. If iron ores are heated with carbon to 1420–1470 K, a molten liquid is formed, an alloy of about 96.5% iron and 3.5% carbon. This product is strong, can be cast into intricate shapes, but is too brittle to be worked, unless the product is decarburized to remove most of the carbon. The vast majority of Chinese iron manufacture, from the late Zhou dynasty onward, was of cast iron. However, forged swords began to be made in the Warring-States-period: "Earliest iron and steel jian also appear, made by the earliest and most basic forging and folding techniques." Iron would become, by around 300 BC, the preferred metal for tools and weapons in China.

The primary advantage of the early blast furnace was in large scale production and making iron implements more readily available to peasants. Cast iron is more brittle than wrought iron or steel, which required additional fining and then cementation or co-fusion to produce, but for menial activities such as farming it sufficed. By using the blast furnace, it was possible to produce larger quantities of tools such as ploughshares more efficiently than the bloomery. In areas where quality was important, such as warfare, wrought iron and steel were preferred. Nearly all Han period weapons are made of wrought iron or steel, with the exception of axe-heads, of which many are made of cast iron.

The effectiveness of the Chinese human and horse powered blast furnaces was enhanced during this period by the engineer Du Shi (c. AD 31), who applied the power of waterwheels to piston-bellows in forging cast iron. Early water-driven reciprocators for operating blast furnaces were built according to the structure of horse powered reciprocators that already existed. That is, the circular motion of the wheel, be it horse driven or water driven, was transferred by the combination of a belt drive, a crank-and-connecting-rod, other connecting rods, and various shafts, into the reciprocal motion necessary to operate a push bellow.

Donald Wagner suggests that early blast furnace and cast iron production evolved from furnaces used to melt bronze. Certainly, though, iron was essential to military success by the time the State of Qin had unified China (221 BC). Usage of the blast and cupola furnace remained widespread during the Song and Tang dynasties. By the 11th century, the Song dynasty Chinese iron industry made a switch of resources from charcoal to coke in casting iron and steel, sparing thousands of acres of woodland from felling. This may have happened as early as the 4th century AD.

Blast furnaces were also later used to produce gunpowder weapons such as cast iron bomb shells and cast iron cannons during the Song dynasty.

== Middle Ages ==
Shen Kuo's written work of 1088 contains, among other early descriptions of inventions, a method of repeated forging of cast iron under a cold blast similar to the modern Bessemer process.

Chinese metallurgy was widely practiced during the Middle Ages; during the 11th century, the growth of the iron industry caused vast deforestation due to the use of charcoal in the smelting process. To remedy the problem of deforestation, the Song Chinese discovered how to produce coke from bituminous coal as a substitute for charcoal. Although hydraulic-powered bellows for heating the blast furnace had been written about since Du Shi's (d. 38) invention of them in the 1st century CE, the first known illustration of a bellows in operation is found in a book written in 1313 by Wang Zhen (fl. 1290–1333).

== Gold and silver ==
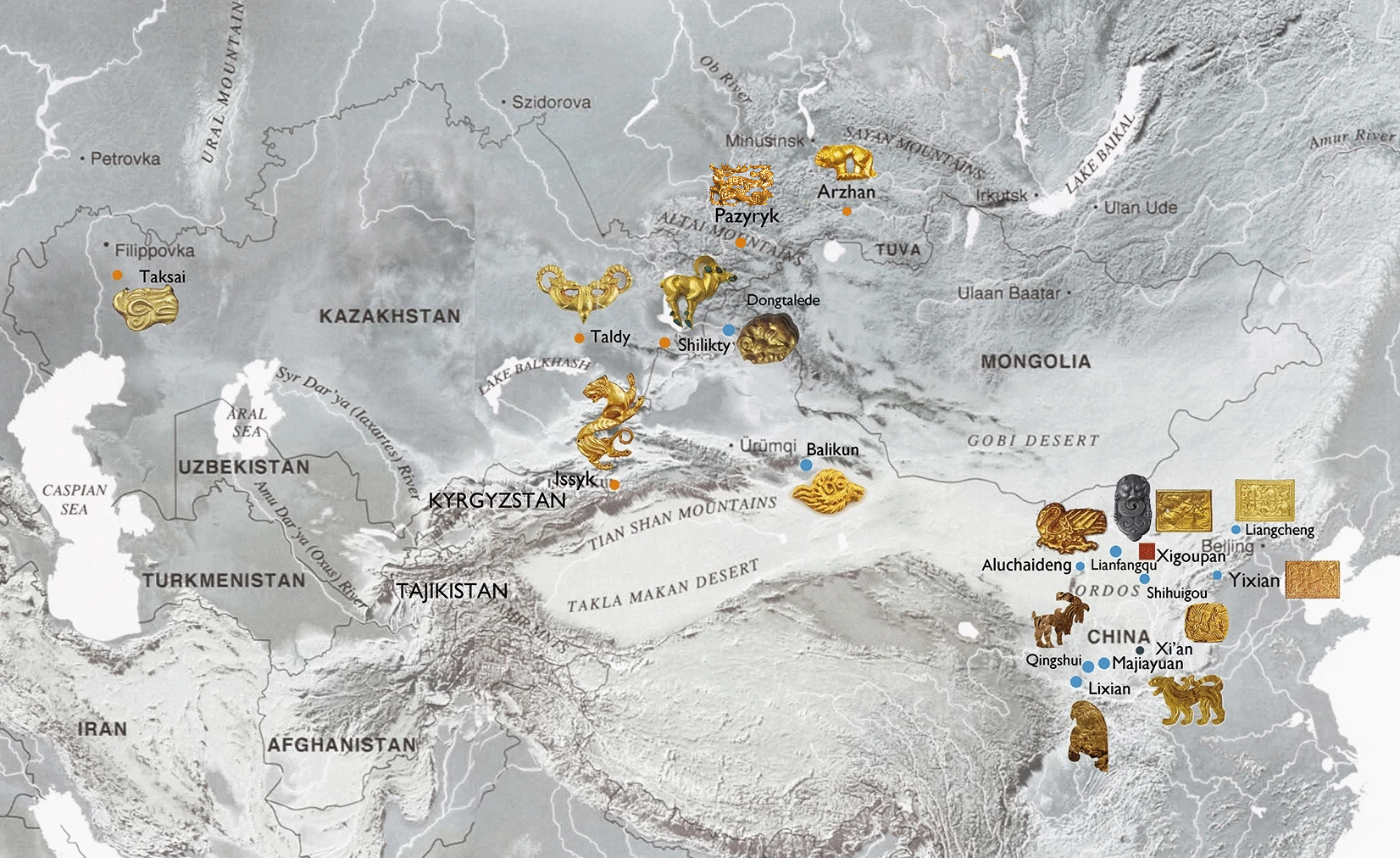
Geographical distribution of early gold and silver artefacts found in Northwest China and Central Asia (8th–3rd century BC).

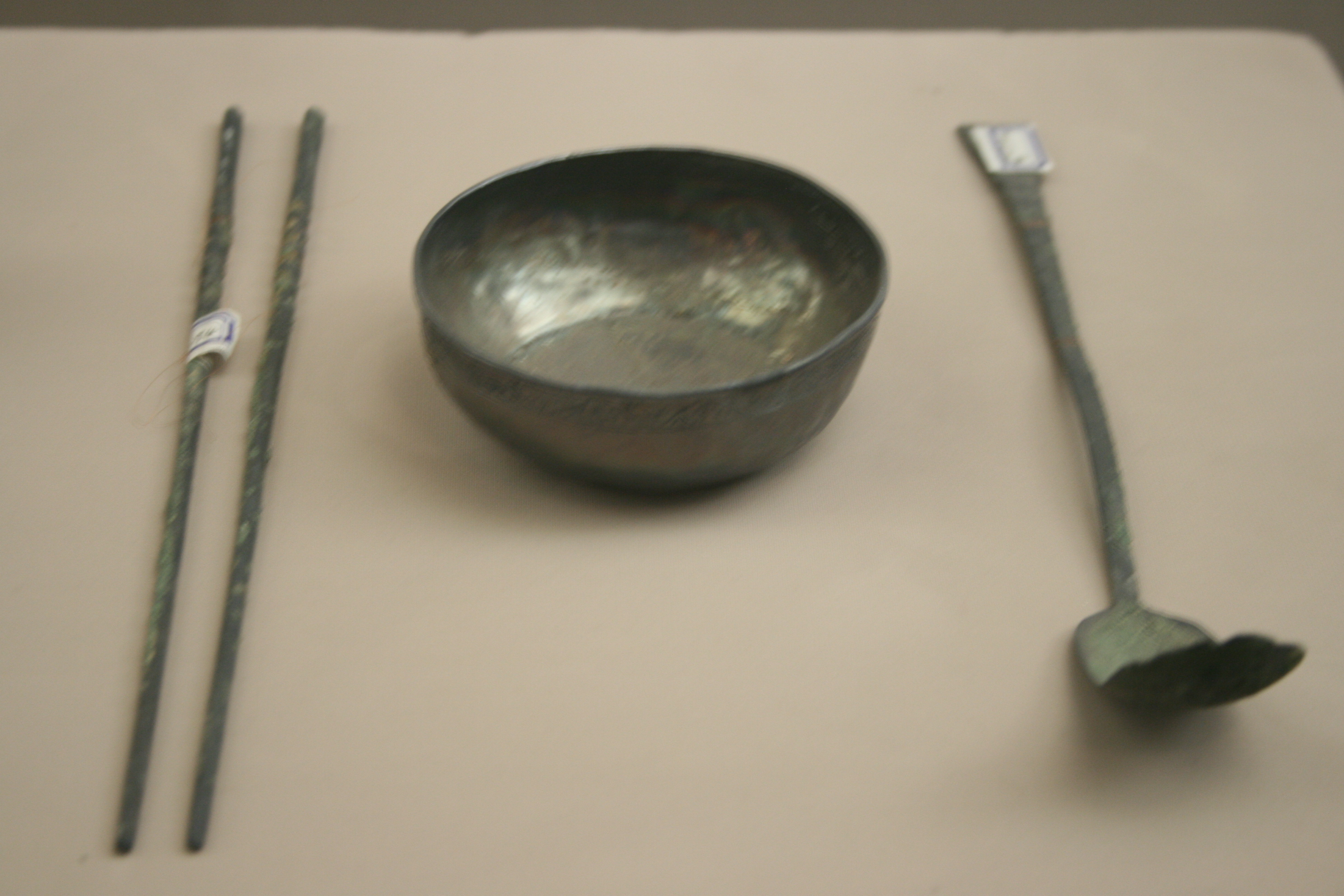
Silver chopsticks, cup, and spoon, Song dynasty

Gold-crafting technology developed in Northwest China during the early Iron Age, following the arrival of new technological skills from the Central Asian steppes, even before the establishment of the Xiongnu (209 BC – AD 150). These technological and artistic exchanges attest to the magnitude of communication networks between China and the Mediterranean, even before the establishment of the Silk Road. The sites of Dongtalede (东塔勒德, 9th–7th century BC) in Xinjiang, or Xigoupan (西沟畔, 4th–3rd century BC) in the Ordos region of Inner Mongolia, are known for numerous artifacts reminiscent of the Scytho-Siberian art of Central Asia.

During the Qing dynasty the gold and silver smiths of Ningbo were noted for the delicacy and tastefulness of their work.

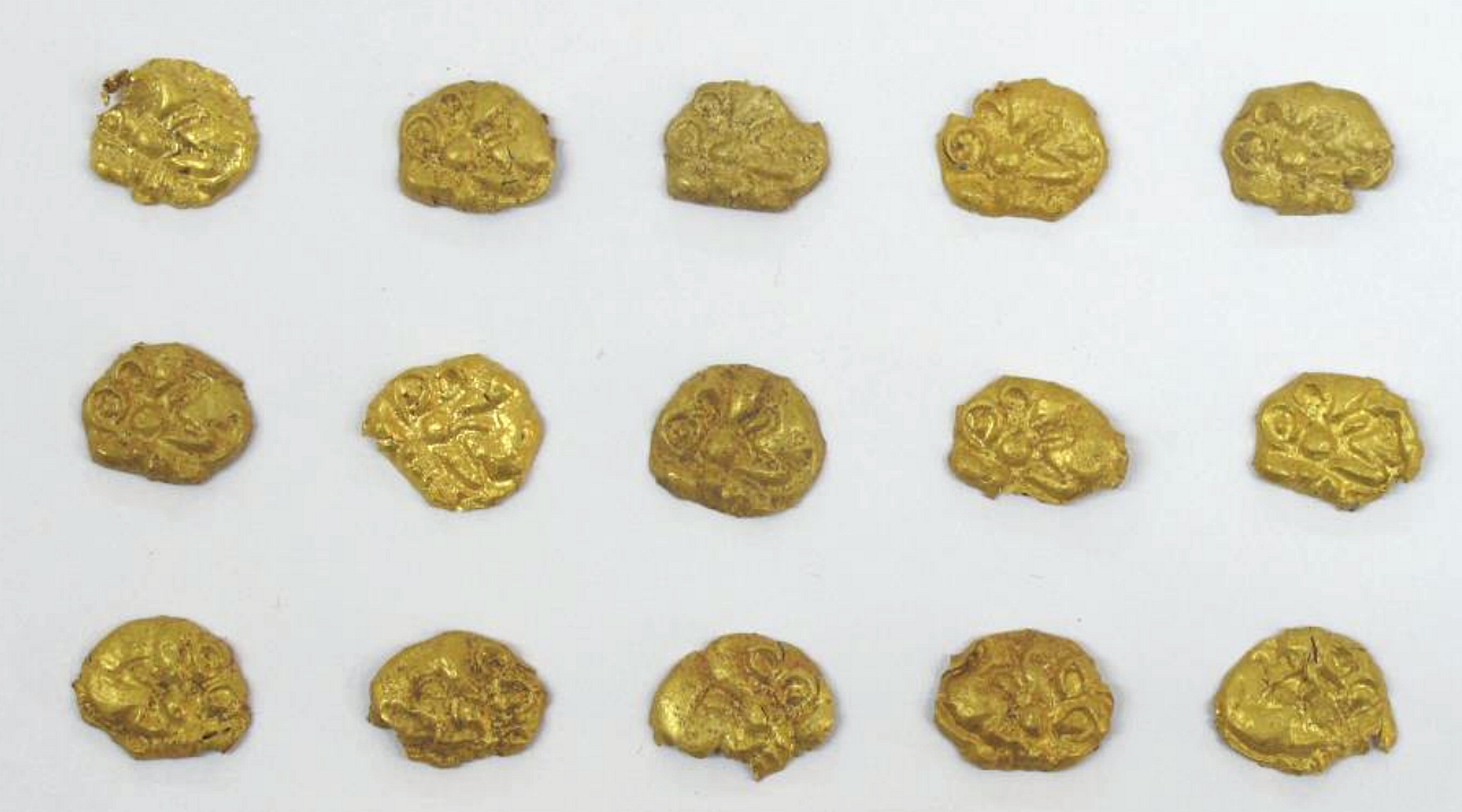
Gold appliqués in the form of snow leopards found in Dongtalede, Northwest China

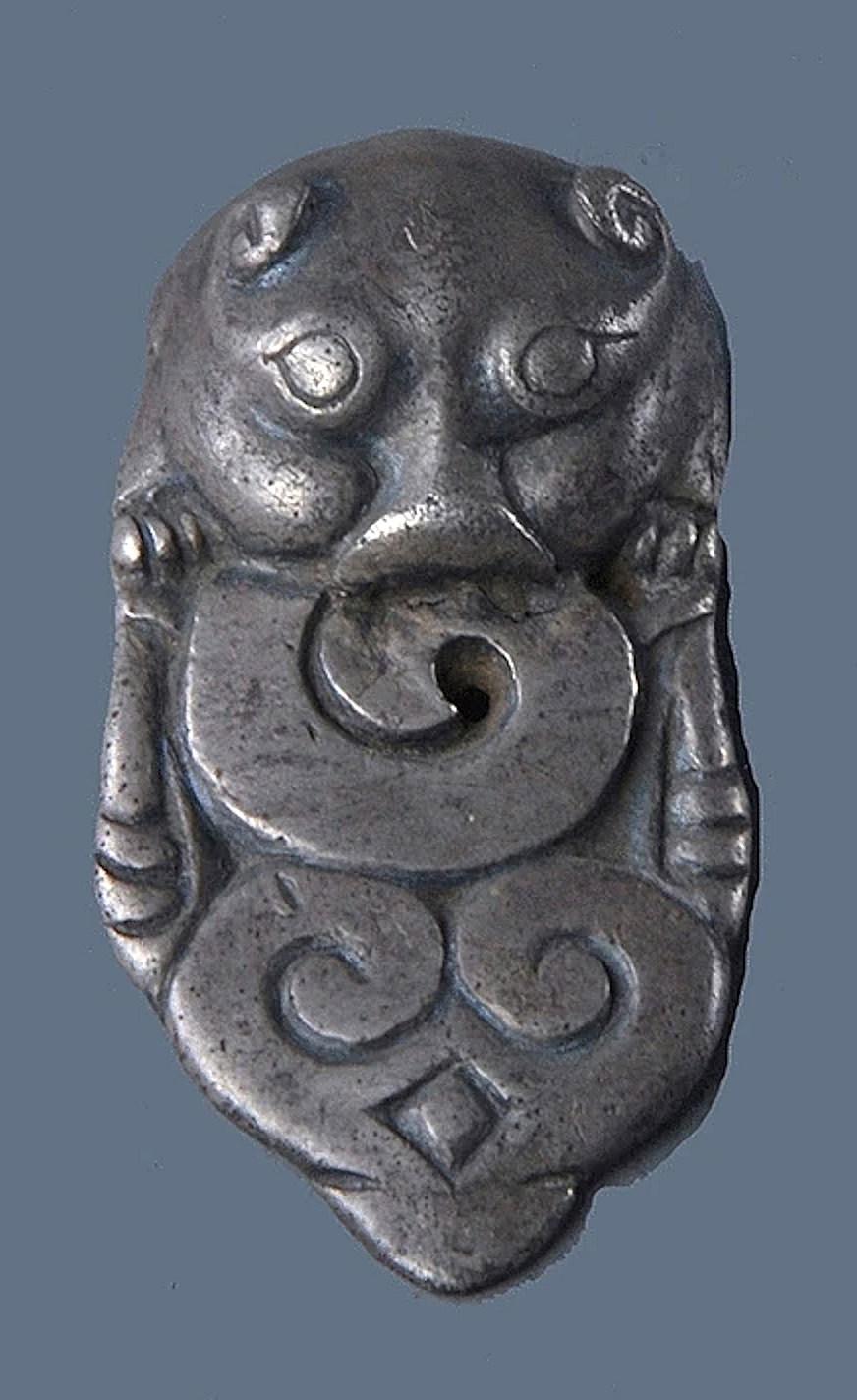
Silver horse harness ornament, Xigoupan M2 (4th–3rd century BC)

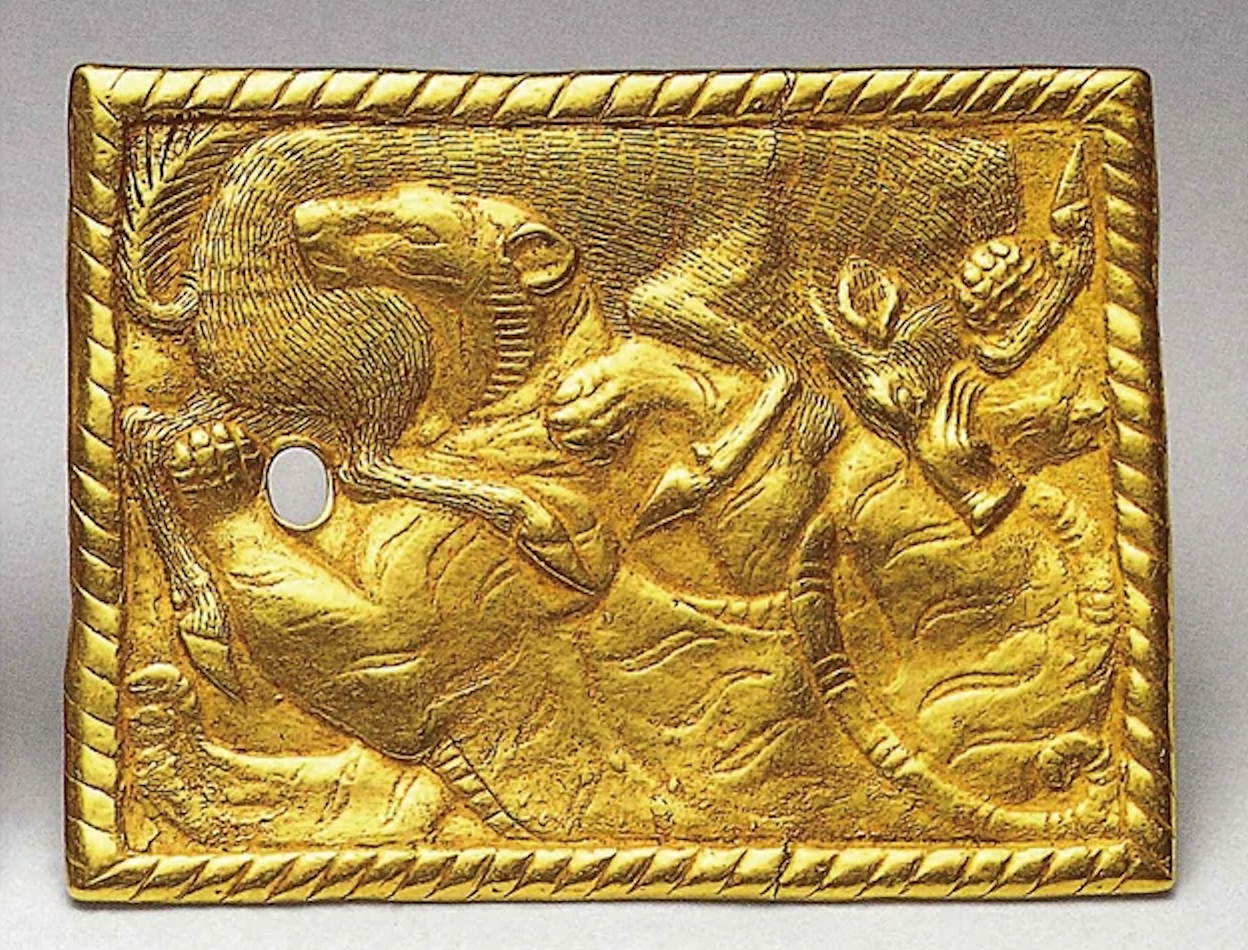
Gold belt buckle inscribed with Chinese characters found in Xigoupan M2 (4th-3rd century BC)

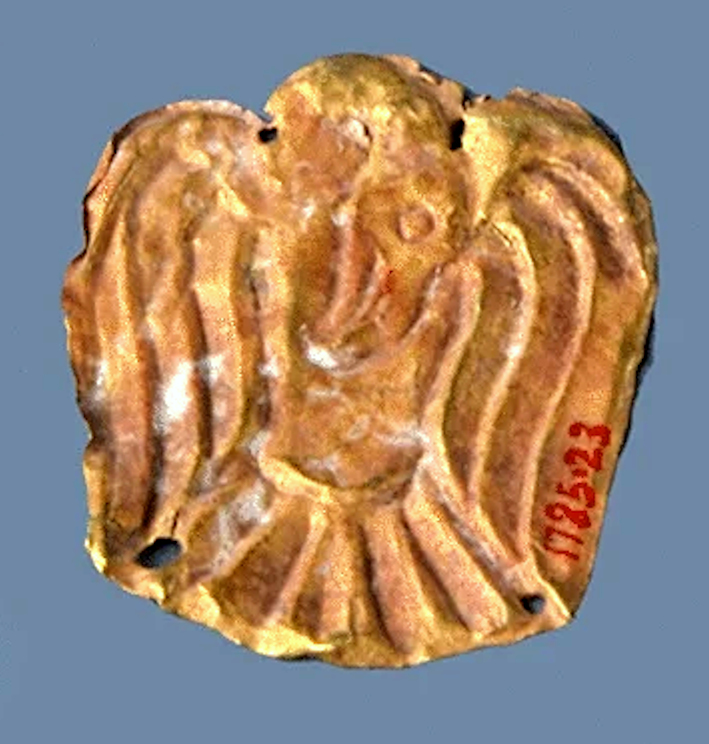
Gold plaque with standing eagle from Xigoupan M2 (4th–3rd century BC)

== Cultural significance ==
Chinese mythology generally reflects a time when metallurgy had long been practiced. According to the Romanian anthropologist, orientalist, and philosopher Mircea Eliade, the Iron Age produced a large number of rites, myths and symbols; the blacksmith was the main agent of diffusion of mythology, rites and metallurgical mysteries. The secret knowledge of metallurgists and their powers made them founders of the human world and masters of the spirit world. This metallurgical model was reinterpreted again by Taoist alchemists.

Some metalworkers illustrate the close relationship between Chinese mystical and sovereign power and the mining and metallurgy industries. Although the name Huangdi is absent from Shang or Zhou inscriptions, it appears in the Spring and Autumn period's Guoyu and Zuo zhuan. According to Mitarai (1984), Huangdi may have lived in early antiquity and led a regional ethnic group who worshiped him as a deity; "The Yellow Emperor fought Chiyou at Mount Kunwu whose summit was covered with a large quantity of red copper".

"The seventy-two brothers of Chiyou had copper heads and iron fronts; they ate iron and stones [...] In the province of Ji where Chiyou is believed to have lived (Chiyou shen), when we dig the earth and we find skulls that seem to be made of copper and iron, they are identified as the bones of Chiyou." Chiyou was the leader of the indigenous Sanmiao (or Jiuli) tribes who defeated Xuanyuan, the future Yellow Emperor. Chiyou, a rival of the Yellow Emperor, belonged to a clan of blacksmiths. The advancement of weaponry is sometimes attributed to the Yellow Emperor and Chiyou, and Chiyou reportedly discovered the process of casting. Kunwu is associated with a people, a royal blacksmith, a mountain which produces metals, and a sword. Kui, a master of music and dance cited by Shun, was succeeded by Yu the Great. The reported founder of the first Chinese dynasty, the Xia dynasty, Yu spent many years working on flood control and is credited with casting the Nine Tripod Cauldrons. Helped by dragons descended from heaven, he died on Mount Xianglu in Zhejiang. In these myths and legends, mines and forges are associated with leadership.

== See also ==
- Economy of China
- Economic history of China before 1912
- Economic history of China (1912–49)
