= Xishanping =

Chinese archeological site

- 西山坪 (Japanese)
- Location in China
- 34°33′50″N 105°32′41″E
- Periods: Neolithic, Bronze Age
- Cultures: Dadiwan culture, Lower Beishouling culture, Majiayao culture, Qijia culture
- Location: Gansu, China
- Region: Tianshui Basin

History
- Built: ca. 7800 BP
- Abandoned: ca. 3000 BP

Site notes
- Elevation: 1,330 m (4,360 ft)
- Area: 204,800 m^{2} (2,204,449 sq ft)
- Excavation dates: 1956, 1986–1990
- Archaeologists: Pei Wenzhong

Xishanping is an archaeological site in Gansu, China, located 15 km (9 mi) west of Tianshui. The site was occupied continuously from the Neolithic through the Bronze Age. The site is situated about 50 m (160 ft) above the riverbed on the southern bank of the Xi River, a tributary of the Wei River. The site was discovered by Pei Wenzhong in 1947.

== Stratigraphy ==
- Xishanping I: the earliest layer, this layer corresponds to the Dadiwan culture. The bones from a large variety of animals (red deer, musk deer, Asiatic black bear, bamboo rat, rat, chicken, dog, pig) were discovered in this layer.
- Xishangping II: this layer corresponds to the Lower Beishouling culture. Only a few animal bones were found in this layer, coming from red deer, cattle and pigs.
- Xishangping III (5250–4300 BP): this period corresponds to the Majiayao culture. The greatest changes at Xishanping occurred during this time. Evidence for intensive agriculture can be found in this layer, starting from around 5,100 BP. Horse, chicken, dog and pig bones were discovered in this layer, with pig bones composing almost half of all of the bones found in this layer. This layer can be further divided as follows:
  - 5250–4650 BP: during this period, the forest was composed primarily of a coniferous-broadleaf mix. The primary staple crops were foxtail and broomcorn millet.
  - 4650–4300 BP: around 4650 BP, the forest saw a drastic transition, most likely due to anthropogenic causes. The forest fauna came to be dominated primarily by fast-growing bamboo. Additionally, several fruit and nut-bearing trees (Castanea, Prunus cerasus, Prunus padus and Diospyros) became more commonly found. The primary staple crops were foxtail millet, broomcorn millet, and buckwheat.
- Xishangping IV (4300–3000 BP): this period corresponds to the Qijia culture. Pig bones form an overwhelming majority of all of the animals bones found from this layer.

== Staple crops ==
Xishanping was the site of a highly diverse and complex agriculture system, showing the earliest largest diversity of staple crops found in China. From 4650–3000 BP, eight major staple crops were found together at Xishanping: wheat (Triticum aestivum), barley and oat (all three introduced from Western Asia); rice (introduced from eastern China); foxtail millet, broomcorn millet, buckwheat and soybean. As such, Xishanping is the earliest site for the introduction of several Western Asia staple crops to China, likely via the Hexi Corridor. Despite the diversity, the people at Xishanping still relied primarily on rainfed agriculture.

The earliest dates for each crop found at Xishanping are as follows:

- Broomcorn millet (5165 BP)
- Foxtail millet (5070 BP)
- Rice (5070 BP) – earliest evidence for rice in northwest China
- Oat (5070 BP) – earliest evidence for oat in China
- Soybean (4770 BP)
- Wheat (4650 BP) – earliest evidence for wheat in China
- Barley (4600–4300 BP) – earliest evidence for barley in China
- Buckwheat (4600–4300 BP)

The first appearance of wheat in East Asia coincides with the first appearance of broomcorn millet in Central Asia at Begash, Kazakhstan (4450–4100 BP).

== Bibliography ==
- Flad, Rowan K. (2007). "Zooarcheological evidence for animal domestication in northwest China". Developments in Quaternary Sciences. 9.
- Li, Xiaoqiang; et al. (2007a). "Early cultivated wheat and broadening of agriculture in Neolithic China" (PDF). The Holocene. 17 (5).
- Li, Xiaoqiang; et al. (2007b). "The record of cultivated rice from archaeobiological evidence in northwestern China 5000 years ago". The Holocene. 52 (10).
- Li, Xiaoqiang; et al. (2012). "Human activity and its impact on the landscape at the Xishanping site in the western Loess Plateau during 4800–4300 cal yr BP based on the fossil charcoal record". Journal of Archaeological Science. 39.
- Liu, Li; et al. (2012). The Archaeology of China: From the Late Paleolithic to the Early Bronze Age. Cambridge University Press.
- Spengler, Robert; et al. (2014). "Early agriculture and crop transmission among Bronze Age mobile pastoralists of Central Eurasia". Proceedings of the Royal Society. 281 (1783) 20133382. doi:10.1098/rspb.2013.3382. PMC 3996608. PMID 24695428.
- Stevens, C. J.; Murphy, C.; Roberts, R.; Lucas, L.; Silva, F.; Fuller, D. Q. (2016). "Between China and South Asia: A Middle Asian corridor of crop dispersal and agricultural innovation in the Bronze Age". The Holocene. 26 (10): 1541–1555. doi:10.1177/0959683616650268. ISSN 0959-6836. PMC 5125436. PMID 27942165.
