= George Findlay Andrew =

British missionary, author, humanitarian and explorer in China

George Findlay Andrew OBE
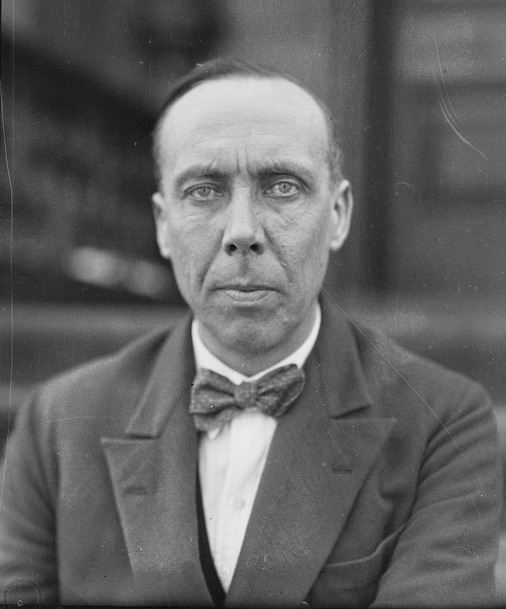
- Born: 14 July 1887; Guiyang, Guizhou, Qing China
- Died: 1971 (aged 83–84); Saskatoon, Saskatchewan, Canada
- Occupations: Missionary, author, humanitarian worker
- Employer: China Inland Mission
- Known for: Work among Chinese Muslims, disaster relief in China, writings on Islam in China, assistance to Johan Gunnar Andersson's archaeological investigations

George Findlay Andrew OBE (1887–1971) was a British Protestant missionary, author, humanitarian worker, and authority on Muslim communities in north-west China. A missionary of the China Inland Mission, he spent much of his life in Gansu and became known for his work among Hui Muslims, his leadership in disaster relief operations, and his publications on Islam in China. He also played a supporting role in the early archaeological investigations that led to the identification of the Majiayao culture (previously called Gansu Yangshao culture).

== Early life and missionary career ==
Andrew was born in Guiyang, Guizhou, to parents serving with the China Inland Mission (CIM). He received his early education at the mission school in Chefoo (now Yantai) before continuing his studies in England. In 1908 he returned to China as a missionary and was assigned to Lanzhou, the capital of Gansu Province.

Over the following decades, Andrew travelled extensively throughout north-west China, particularly among Hui Muslim communities. Through his fluency in local languages and his close relationships with both Chinese and Muslim leaders, he became one of the best-known Protestant observers of Islam in China.

== Author and scholar of Chinese Islam ==
Andrew's experiences among Muslim communities formed the basis of his best-known work, The Crescent in North-West China (1921), one of the earliest English-language studies devoted to Islam in China. The book described the history, customs, religious practices and social conditions of Muslims in Gansu and neighbouring provinces, helping to introduce the subject to Western audiences.

His expertise on Chinese Islam led government officials, missionaries and scholars to seek his advice on the Muslim populations of China's northwest frontier regions.

== Humanitarian work ==
Andrew became widely respected for his relief work during recurrent natural disasters in north-west China. He participated in major relief efforts during the droughts, famines and floods that affected the region during the late 1920s and early 1930s. In 1931 he joined China's National Flood Relief Commission and worked closely with both Chinese and international aid organisations.

During the Second Sino-Japanese War he assisted the Chinese Red Cross and international refugee organisations in Shanghai, helping civilians displaced by the conflict.

== Collaboration with Johan Gunnar Andersson ==
Andrew played an important but often overlooked role in the early archaeological investigations of north-west China conducted by the Swedish geologist and archaeologist Johan Gunnar Andersson. For this work he received a thank you letter from the amateur archaeologist and Swedish crown prince Gustaf Adolf (later King Gustaf VI Adolf).

While stationed in Lanzhou, Andrew established extensive contacts with local residents, traders and village leaders. Through these networks he obtained some of the first intact Neolithic pottery vessels later identified as belonging to the Yangshao culture (later labeled the Majiayao culture, named after the site Majiayao). He brought these artefacts to Andersson's attention and supplied additional material for study.

According to later accounts, Andrew also conducted preliminary investigations in the Tao River valley south of Lanzhou and provided information that contributed to the discovery of prehistoric burial sites. His local knowledge and contacts enabled Andersson to acquire archaeological material from areas that were otherwise difficult for foreign researchers to access.

Andersson mentioned Andrew in his memoir Children of the Yellow Earth (Swedish: Gula jordens barn), acknowledging the assistance he received in Gansu during the formative period of his archaeological work in China.

== Business and wartime service ==
In 1933 Andrew joined Butterfield & Swire, becoming head of the company's Department of Chinese Affairs. During the Second World War he served as a Sino-British liaison officer attached to the British Special Operations Executive (SOE) in Chongqing.

== Later life ==
Following the establishment of the People's Republic of China, Andrew left China and eventually settled in Saskatoon, Saskatchewan, Canada. He died there in 1971.

== Selected works ==
- The Crescent in North-West China (1921)
