= Banshan =

Banshan phase
- Geographical range: China
- Period: Neolithic China
- Dates: c. 2600 – c. 2300 BC
- Type site: Banshan
- Preceded by: Majiayao phase
- Followed by: Machang phase

Banshan was a phase of the Chinese Neolithic Majiayao culture, c. 2600 to 2300 BC. The Banshan site is in Guanghe County, Gansu.

In 1923 and 1924, Swedish scholar J. G. Anderson discovered the sites of Banshan, Majiayao, Machang, Qijia and Xindian at Lajia on the north bank of the Yellow River.

== Gallery ==
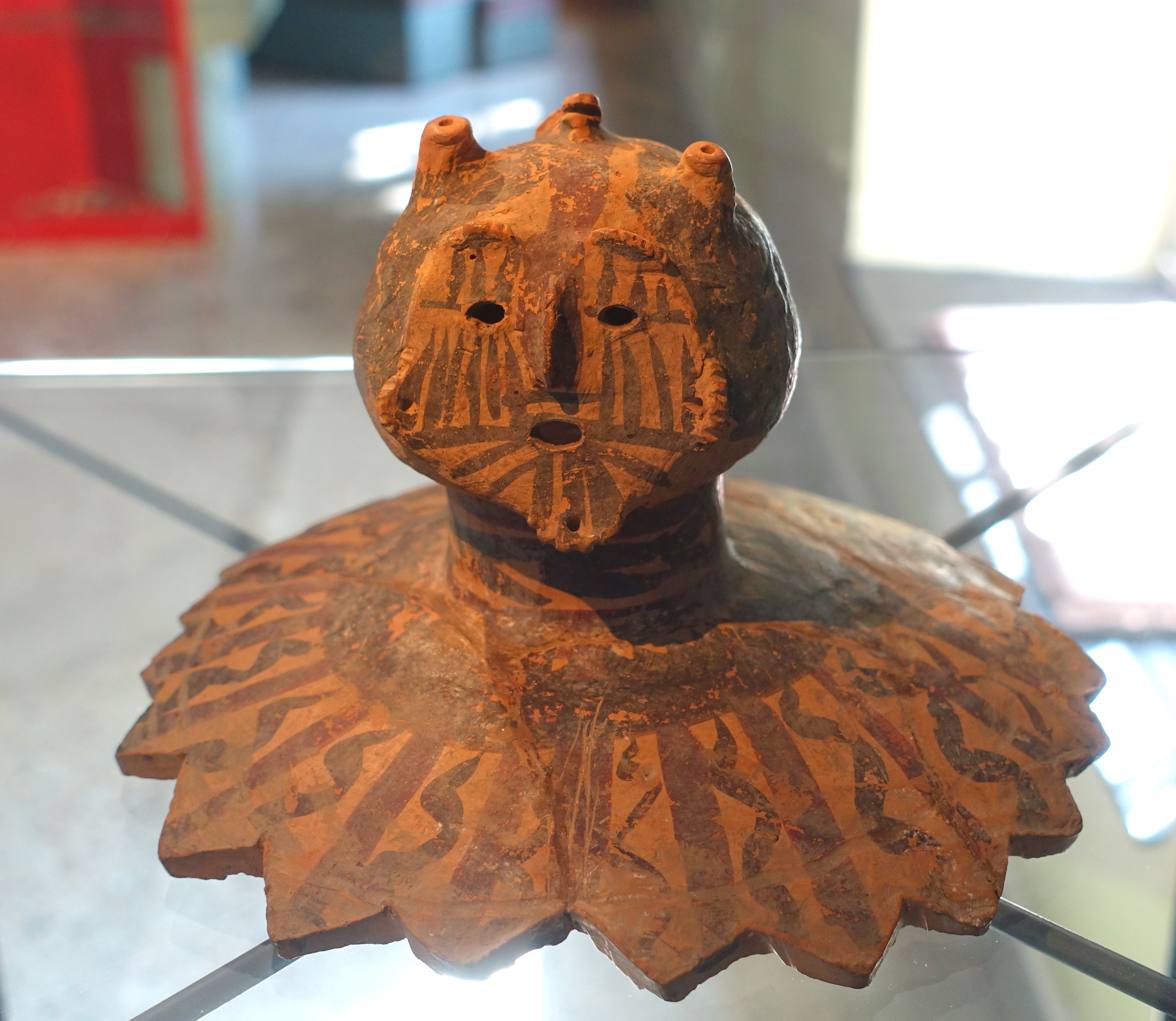
Human head, part of urn from the Banshan phase of the Yangshao culture. Museum of Far Eastern Antiquities (Östasiatiska museet), Stockholm.

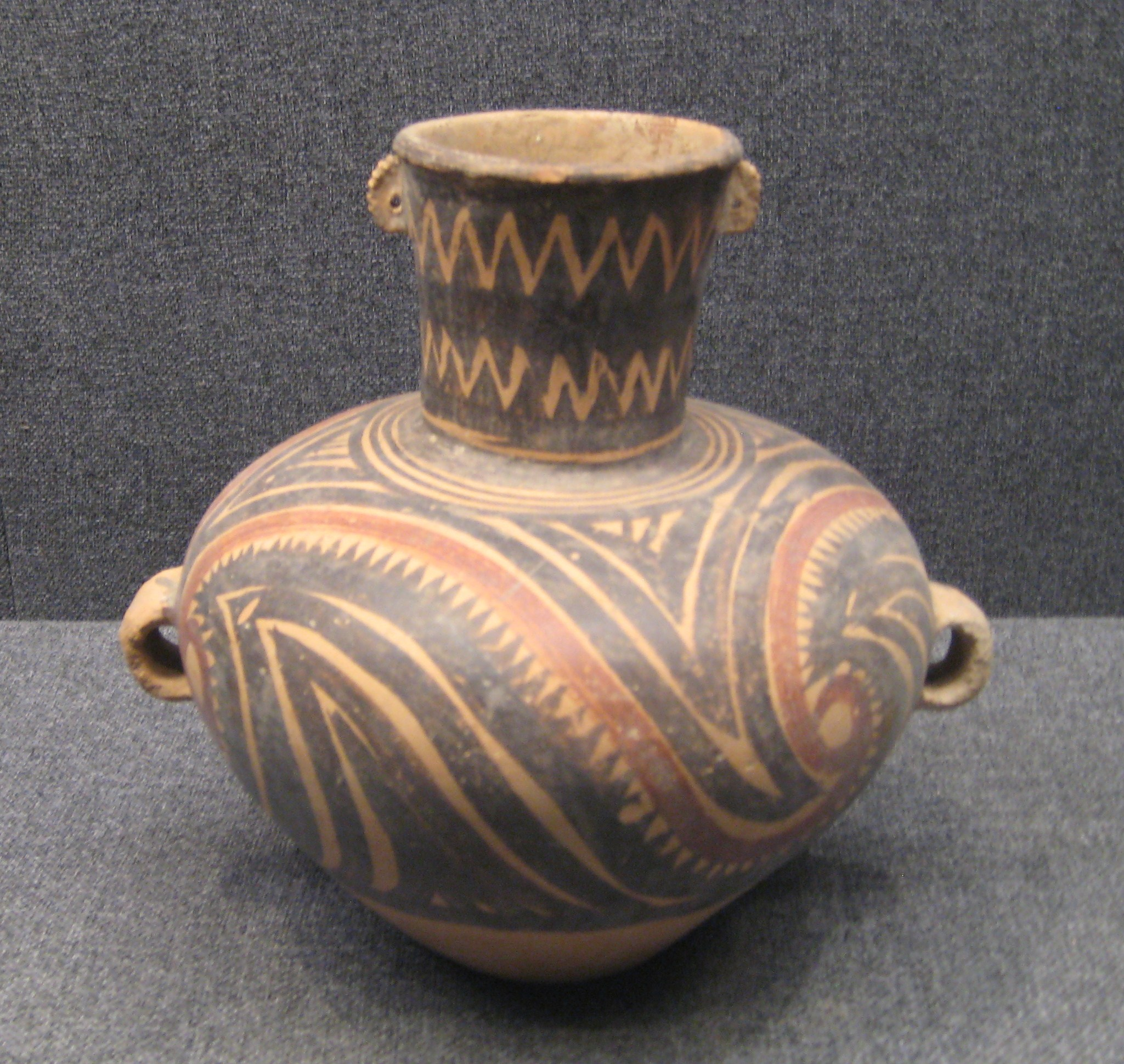
Painted pottery jug from the Banshan phase of the Yangshao culture. The Museum of the Mausoleum of the Nanyue King, Guangzhou, China.

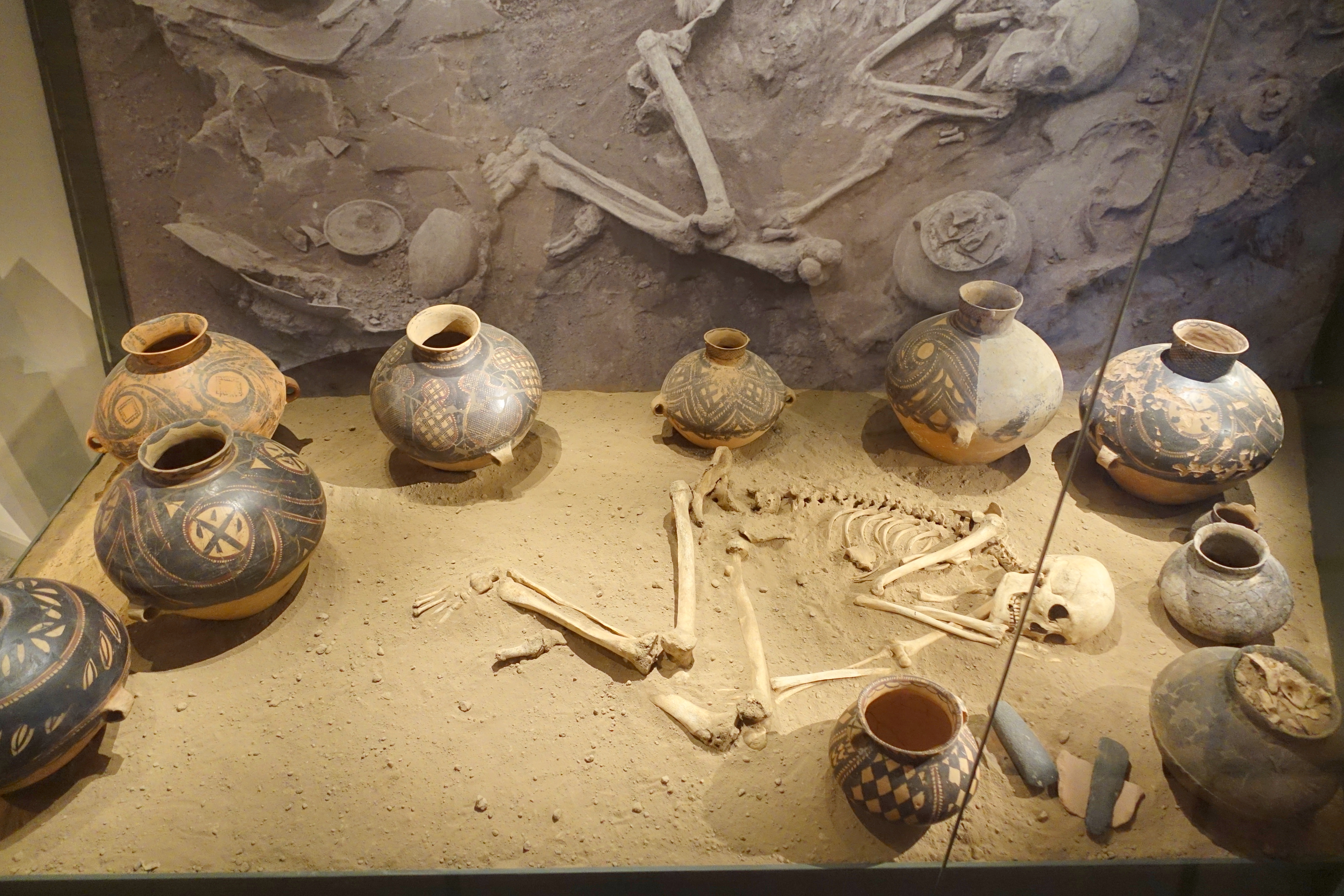
Reconstruction of a Banshan phase burial site in the Museum of Far Eastern Antiquities, Stockholm
