= Dongtalede =

Archaeological site in Xinjiang, China

- Location of Dongtalede, with contemporary cultures in the 6th century BCE
- Geographical range: Xinjiang
- Dates: 9-7th centuries BCE
- Major sites: 46.377732°N 87.851256°E
- Preceded by: Karasuk culture
- Followed by: Aldy-Bel culture, Pazyryk culture, Tagar culture

Dongtalede (Ch: 东塔勒德) is an archaeological site in Xinjiang with numerous artifacts riminescent of the Scytho-Siberian art of Central Asia. It is dated to the 9th-7th century BCE. The site has been of primary importance in understanding how new gold-crafting technology developed in Northwest China during the early Iron Age, following the arrival of new technological skills from the central Asian steppes. These technological and artistic exchanges attest to the magnitude of communication networks between China and the Mediterranean, even long before the establishment of the Silk Road.

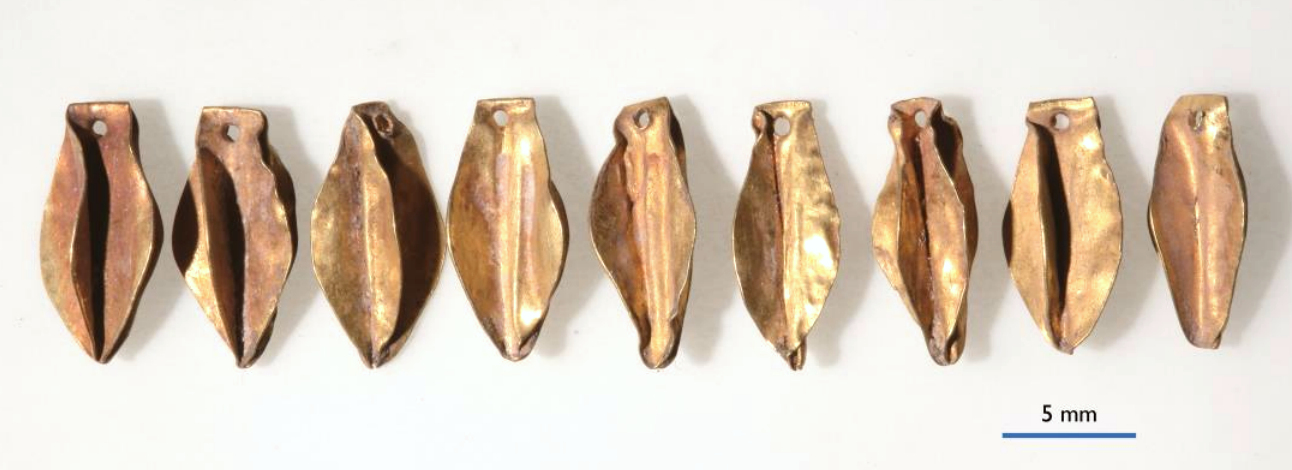
Gold beech-nut pendants found in tomb 3 of Dongtalede, the Xinjiang Altai region, Northwest China

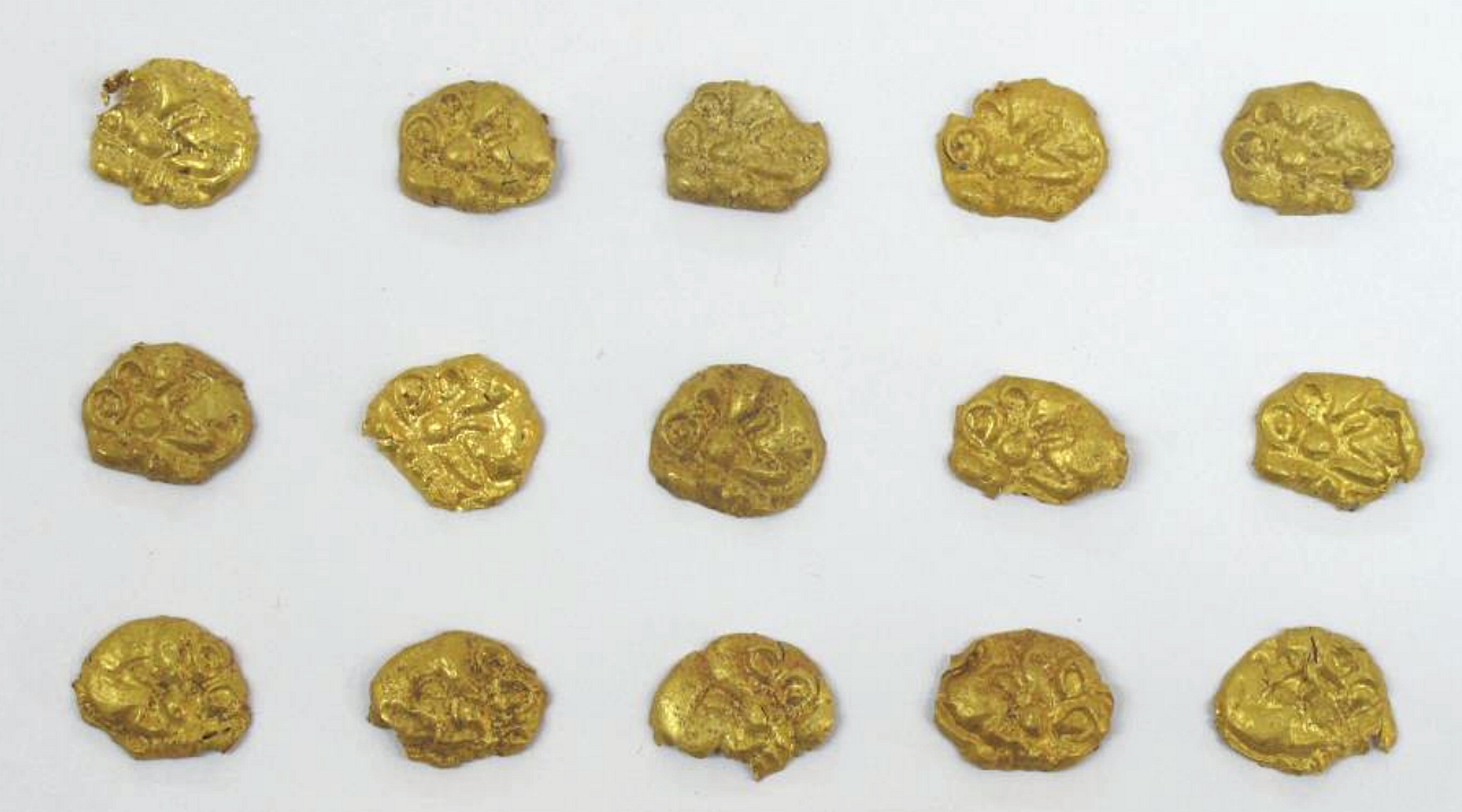
Gold appliqués in the form of snow leopards found in Dongtalede, Northwest China

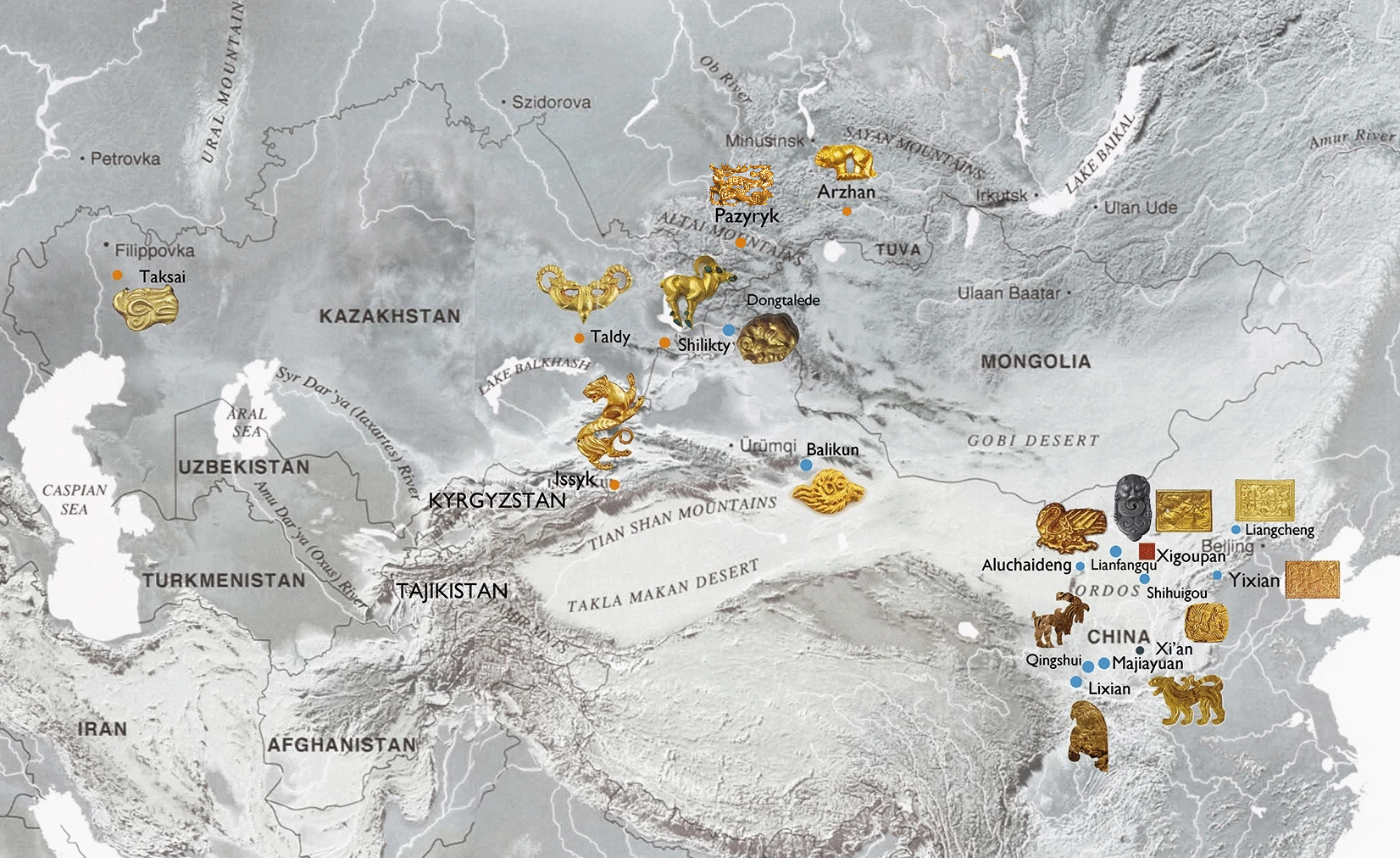
Dongtalede in the geographical distribution of early gold and silver artefacts found in Northwest China and Central Asia (8th-3rd century BCE).

== See also ==
- Xigoupan
