= Xigoupan =

Archaeological site in China

- Location of Xigoupan, with contemporary cultures in the 6th century BCE
- Geographical range: Xinjiang
- Dates: 9-7th centuries BCE
- Major sites: 40.056100°N 110.789288°E
- Preceded by: Karasuk culture
- Followed by: Aldy-Bel culture, Pazyryk culture, Tagar culture

Xigoupan (Ch:西沟畔) is an archaeological site in the Ordos region of Inner Mongolia, known for numerous artifacts reminiscent of the Scytho-Siberian art of Central Asia. The tombs are dated to the 4th-3rd century BCE and pertain to the Ordos culture. The site has been of primary importance in understanding how new gold-crafting technology developed in Northwest China during the early Iron Age, following the arrival of new technological skills from the central Asian steppes, even before the establishment of the Xiongnu (209 BCE-150 CE). These technological and artistic exchanges attest to the magnitude of communication networks between China and the Mediterranean, even before the establishment of the Silk Road.

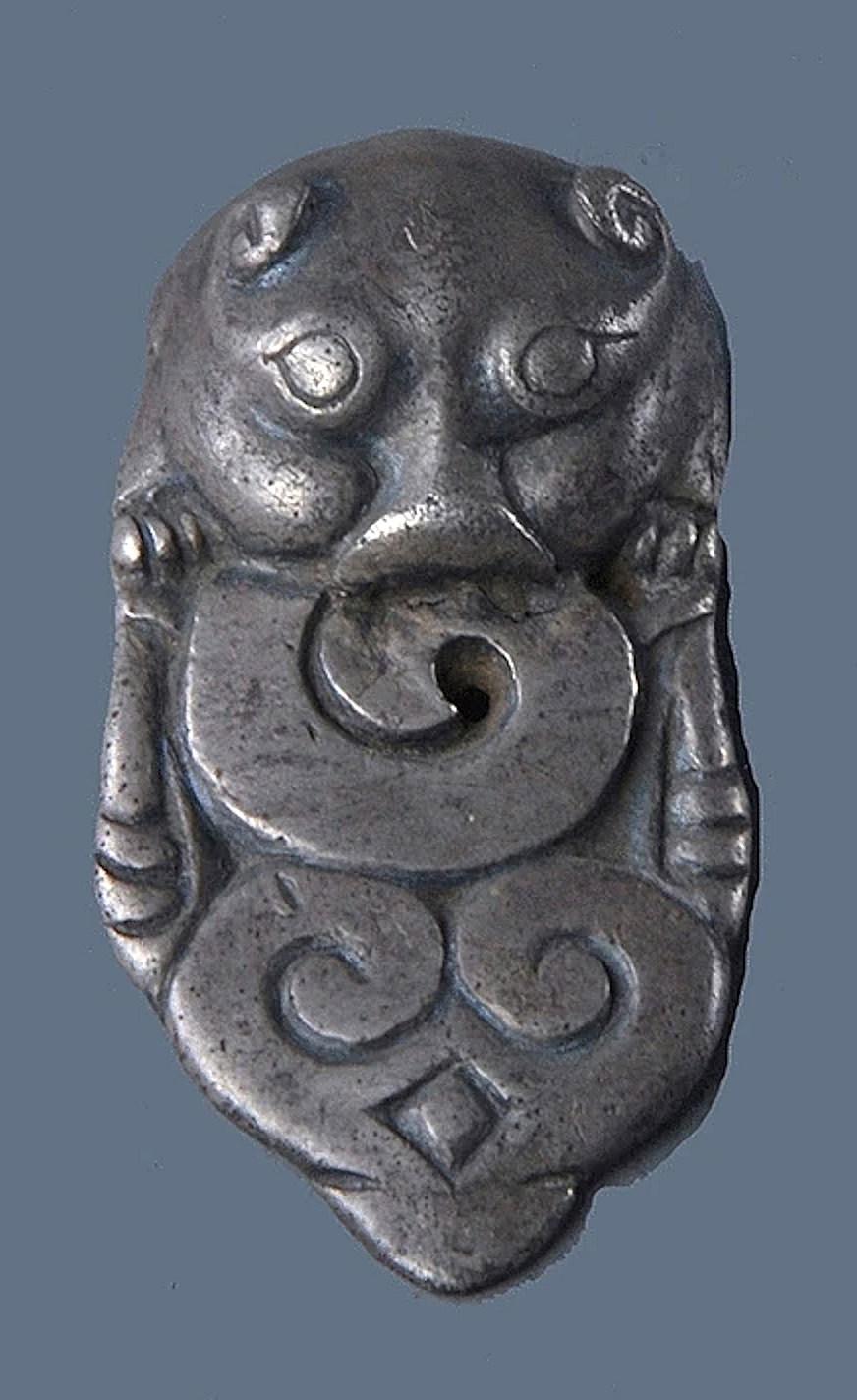
Silver horse harness ornament, Xigoupan M2 (4th–3rd c. BCE)

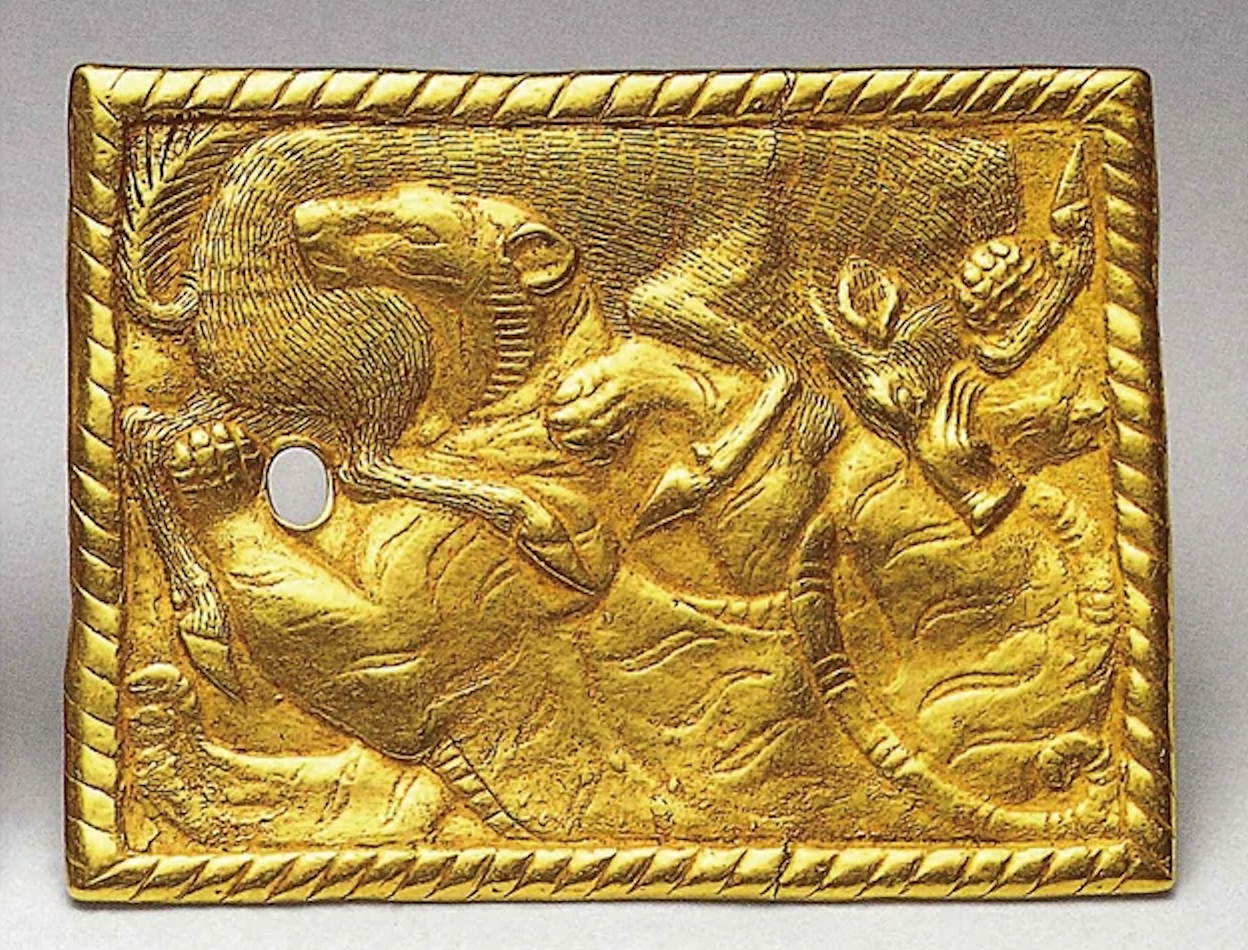
Gold belt buckle inscribed with Chinese characters found in Xigoupan M2 (4th-3rd century BCE)

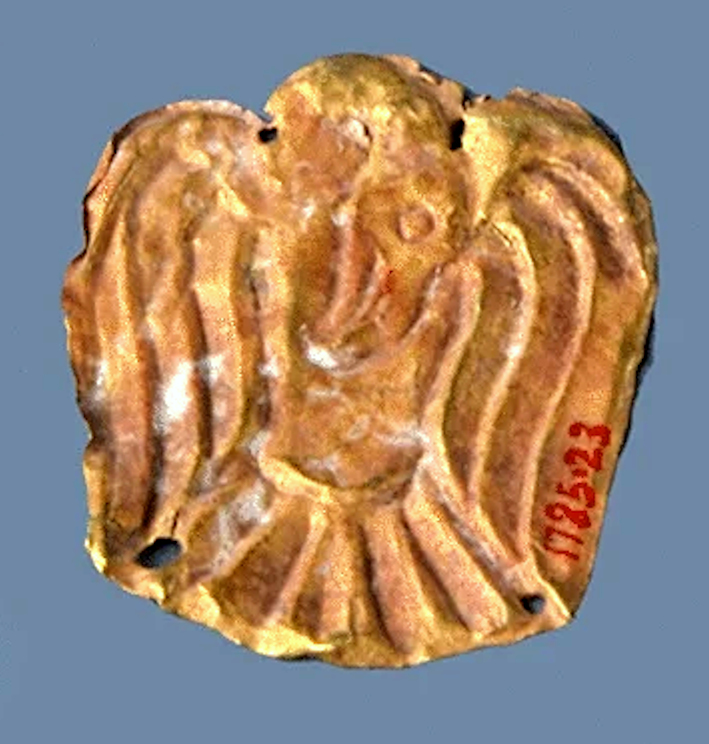
Gold plaque with standing eagle from Xigoupan M2 (4th–3rd c. BCE)

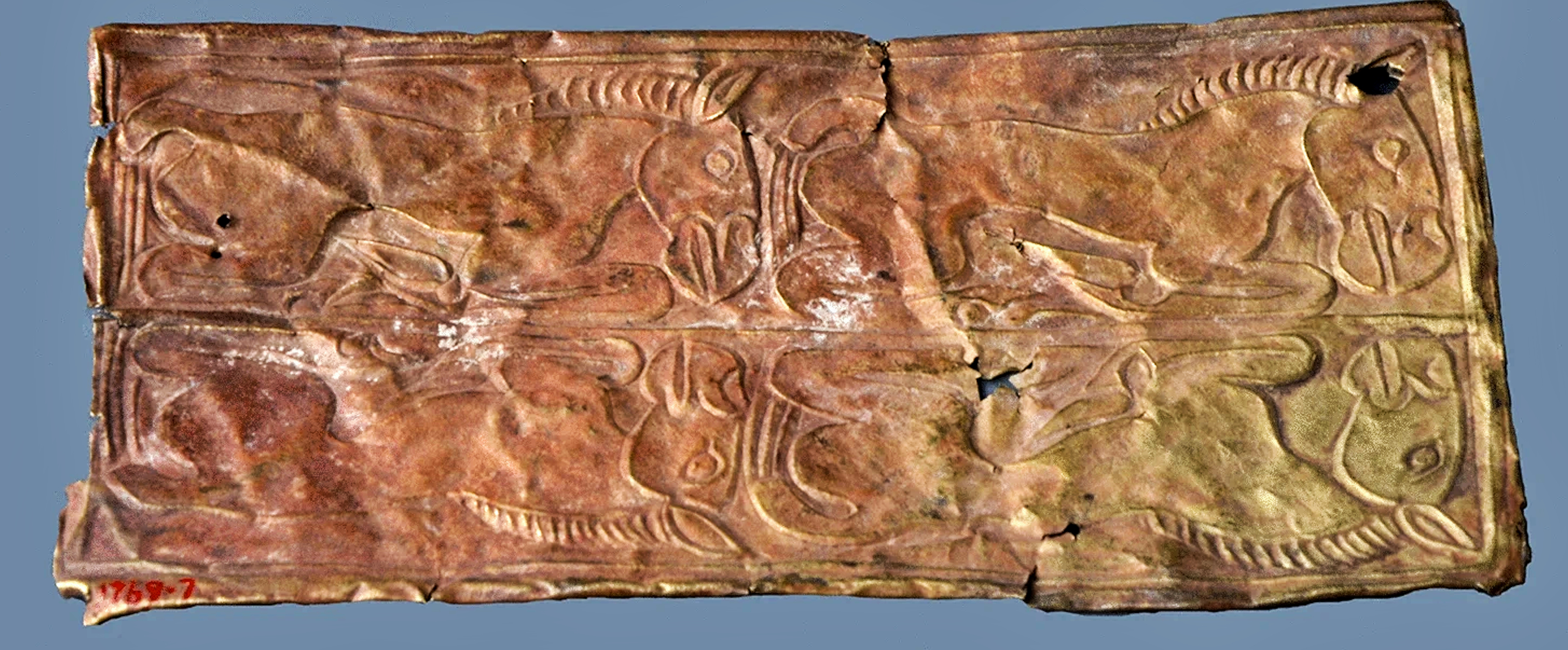
Gold plaque with horses from Xigoupan M2 (4th–3rd c. BCE).

== See also ==
- Dongtalede
