= The Holocene =

Scientific journal

- Discipline: Environmental studies
- Language: English
- Edited by: John A. Matthews

Publication details
- History: 1991-present
- Publisher: SAGE Publications
- Frequency: 8/year
- Impact factor: 2.595 (2011)

Standard abbreviations
- ISO 4: Holocene

Indexing
- CODEN: HOLOE6
- ISSN: 0959-6836 (print); 1477-0911 (web)
- LCCN: 91640904
- OCLC no.: 300872570

Links
- Journal homepage; Online access; Online archive

The Holocene is a peer-reviewed scientific journal that covers research in the field of environmental studies, in particular environmental change over the last c. 11,500 years, particularly the interface between the long Quaternary record and the natural and human-induced environmental processes operating at the Earth's surface today. It is published eight times a year by SAGE Publications. The editor-in-chief is John A. Matthews (University of Wales, Swansea).

== Scope ==
Included within the scope of The Holocene, according to the journal's website, are articles related to:

- "Geological, biological and archaeological evidence of recent climate change;
- "Interdisciplinary studies of environmental history and prehistory;
- "The development of natural and cultural landscapes and ecosystems; and
- "The prediction of future changes in the environment from the record of the past."

== Abstracting and indexing ==
The journal is abstracted and indexed in Academic Search Premier, Current Contents, the British and Irish Archaeological Bibliography, Scopus, and the Science Citation Index. According to the Journal Citation Reports, its 2011 impact factor is 2.595, ranking it 9th out of 44 journals in the category "Geography, Physical" and 26th out of 170 journals in the category "Geosciences, Multidisciplinary".

== See also ==
- Climate change (modern day)
- Climate change (general concept)
