= Majiayao culture =

3300–2000 BC Chinese archaeological culture

- Geographical range: upper Yellow River
- Period: Neolithic China
- Dates: c. 3300 – c. 2000 BC
- Preceded by: Yangshao culture (5000–3000 BC)
- Followed by: Qijia culture

Chinese name
- Simplified Chinese: 马家窑文化
- Traditional Chinese: 馬家窯文化
Transcriptions
Standard Mandarin
- Hanyu Pinyin: Mǎjiāyáo Wénhuà

Majiayao culture and contemporary cultures c. -3000

The Majiayao culture was a group of Neolithic communities who lived primarily in the upper Yellow River region in eastern Gansu, eastern Qinghai and northern Sichuan, China. The culture existed from 3300 to 2000 BC. The Majiayao culture represents the first time that the upper Yellow River region was widely occupied by agricultural communities and it is famous for its painted pottery, which is regarded as a peak of pottery manufacturing at that time.

The Majiayao culture benefited from the warm and humid climatic conditions from the Late Glacial to the Middle Holocene, which led to flourishing agricultural production and rapid population growth. These conditions changed with the aridification of the Late Holocene, provoking material and cultural decline.

The Majiayao culture may be associated with the expansion of early Sino-Tibetan peoples during the Neolithic.

== History ==
The archaeological site was first found in 1924 near the village of Majiayao in Lintao County, Gansu by Swedish archaeologist Johan Gunnar Andersson, who considered it part of the Yangshao culture. Following the work of Xia Nai, the founder of modern archaeology in the People's Republic of China, it has since been considered a distinct culture, named after the original site, whereas previously it had been referred to as the "Gansu Yangshao" culture. This culture developed from the middle Yangshao (Miaodigou) phase, through an intermediate Shilingxia phase. The culture is often divided into three phases: Majiayao (3300–2500 BC), Banshan (2500–2300 BC) and Machang (2300–2000 BC).

At the end of the 3rd millennium BC, the Qijia culture succeeded the Majiayao culture at sites in three main geographic zones: eastern Gansu, central Gansu, and western Gansu/eastern Qinghai.

== Location ==
Majiayao phase (3300–2500 BC) sites are mostly found on terraces along: the upper Wei River valley; upper Bailong River valley; middle and lower Tao River and Daxia River valleys; upper Yellow River valley; the Huangshui River; and lower Datong River.

== Pottery ==
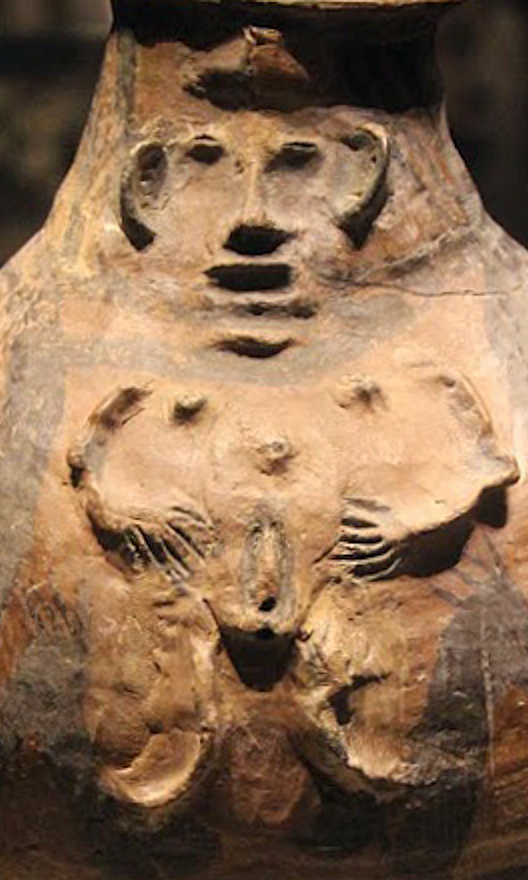
Anthropomorphic figure on a Majiayao culture painted pottery jar (3200–2000 BC) National Museum of China.

The most distinctive artifacts of the Majiayao culture are the painted pottery. During the Majiayao phase, potters decorated their wares with designs in black pigment featuring sweeping parallel lines and dots. Pottery of the Banshan phase is distinguished by curvilinear designs using both black and red paints. Machang-phase pottery is similar, but often not as carefully finished. Its development is associated with interaction between hunter-gatherers in the Qinghai region and the westward expansion of agricultural Yangshao people.

In contrast to plain pottery, the Majiayao painted pottery was produced at large, centralised workshops. The largest Neolithic workshop found in China is at Baidaogouping, Gansu. The manufacture of large amounts of painted pottery means there were professional craftspeople to produce it, which is taken to indicate increasing social complexity. Control over the production process and quality declined by the Banshan phase, potentially due to greater demand for pottery to use in funeral rituals, similar to what Hung Ling-yu calls the "modern Wal-Mart syndrome".

Pottery style emerging from the Yangshao culture spread to the Majiayao culture, and then further to Xinjiang and Central Asia.

Samples of Majiayao pottery from different phases

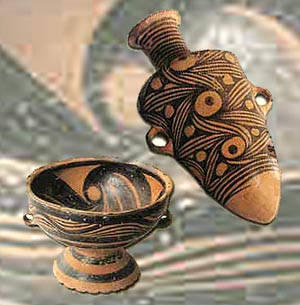
Majiayao phase

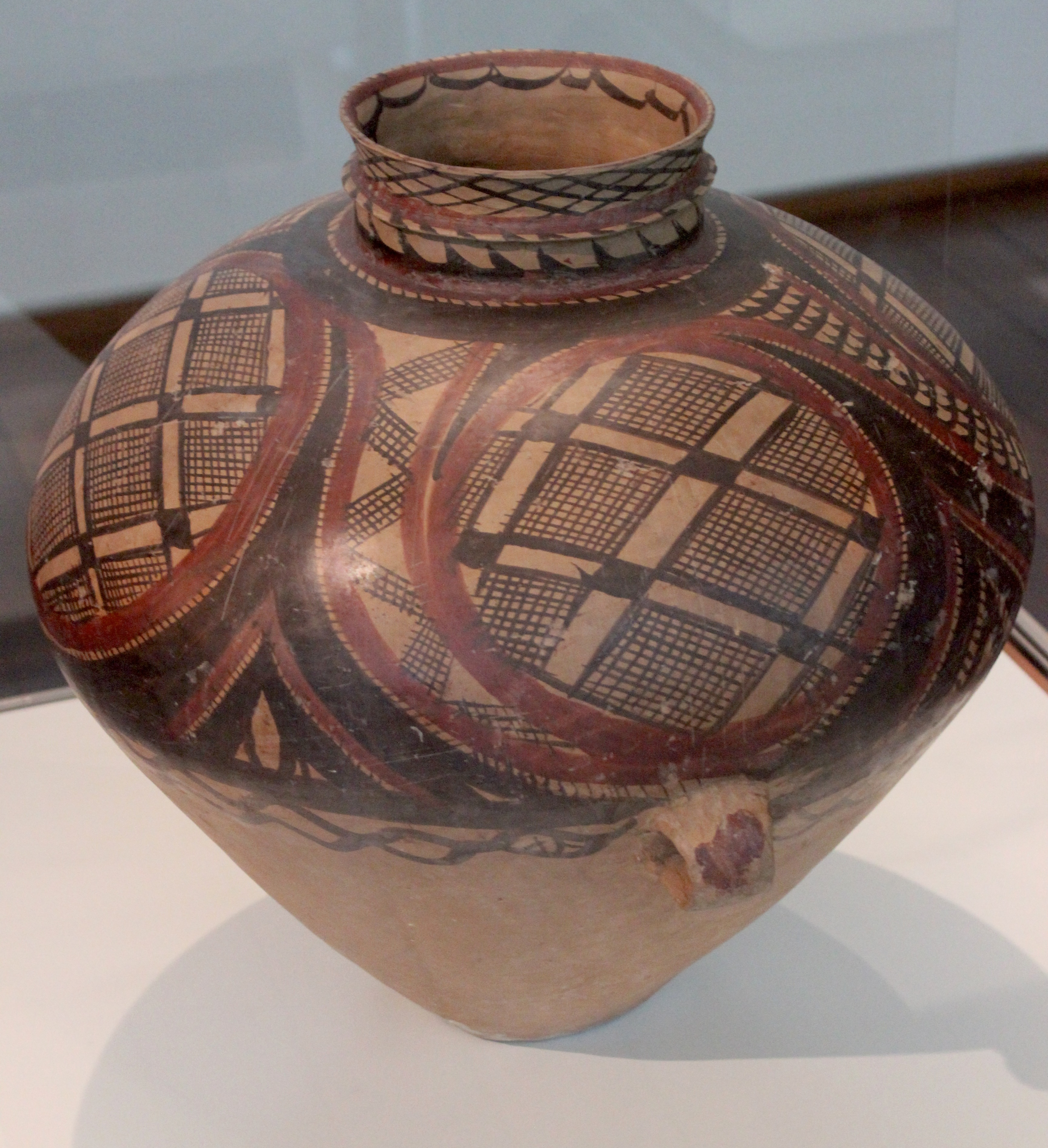
Banshan phase

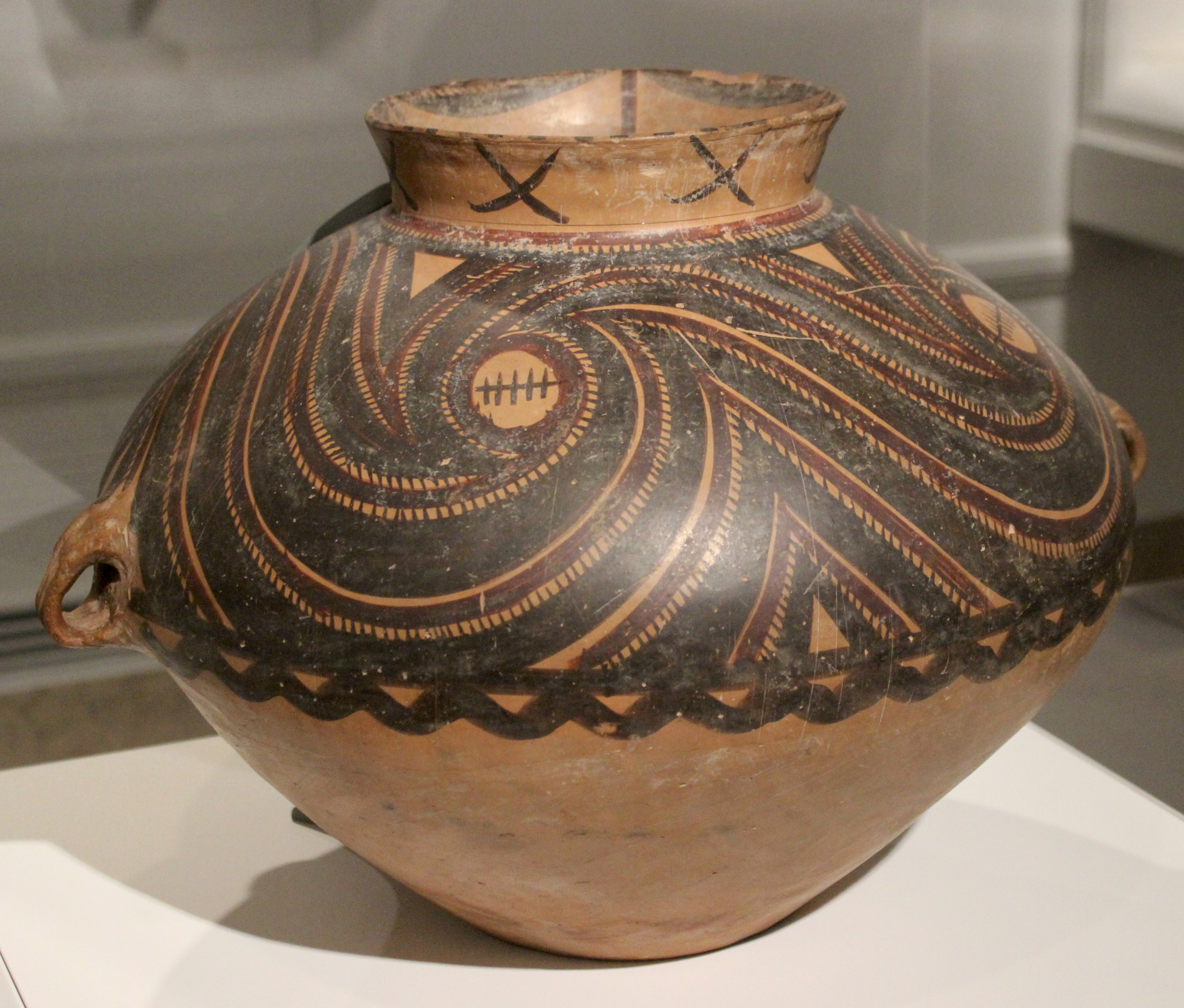
Banshan phase

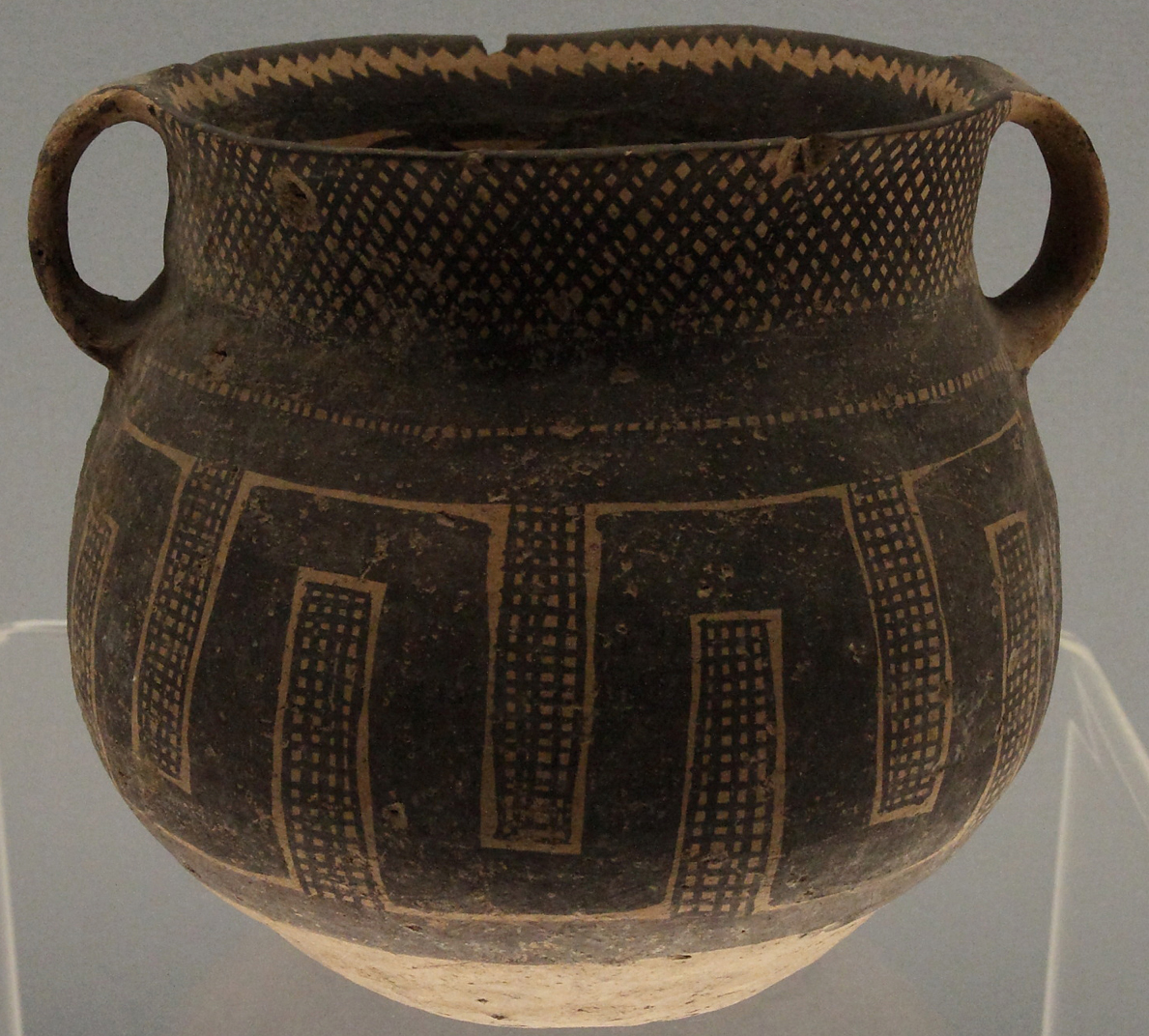
Machang phase

=== Symbolism ===
The Majiayao culture used a wide variety of symbols in its pottery, some of them abstract and geometric, including the well-known Neolithic symbol of the Swastika, some of them figurative, such as frontal and rather realistic anthropomorphic depictions, The Swastika symbol was particularly used during the final Majiayao Machang period (2300–2000 BC), and became a current symbol in Buddhism representing samsara. The symbols include net patterns, eight-angled star patterns, connected-shell patterns, petal patterns, vortex patterns etc... Many motifs were already known from the preceding Yangshao culture (5000–3000 BC).

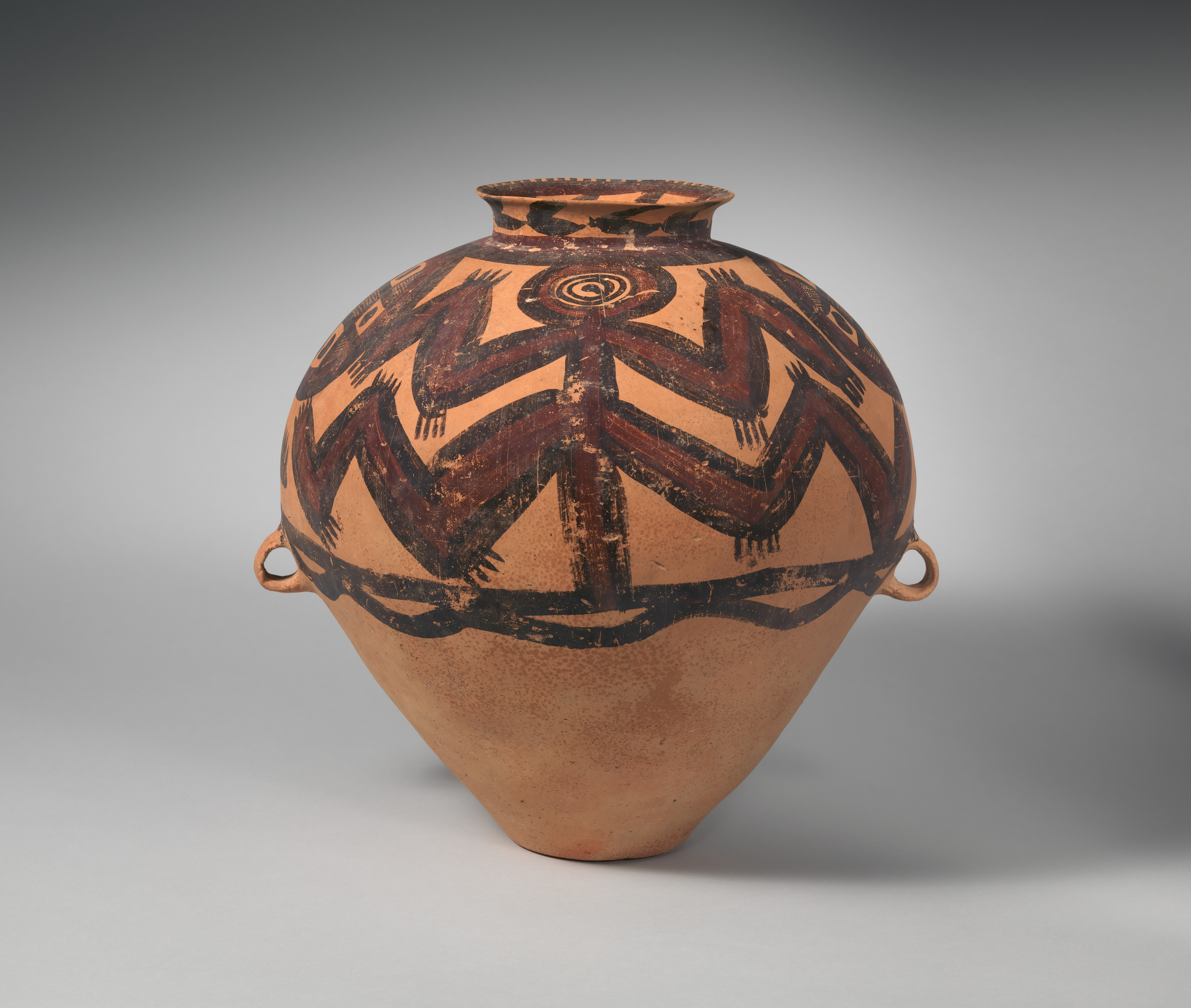
Symbolic "Frog" pattern

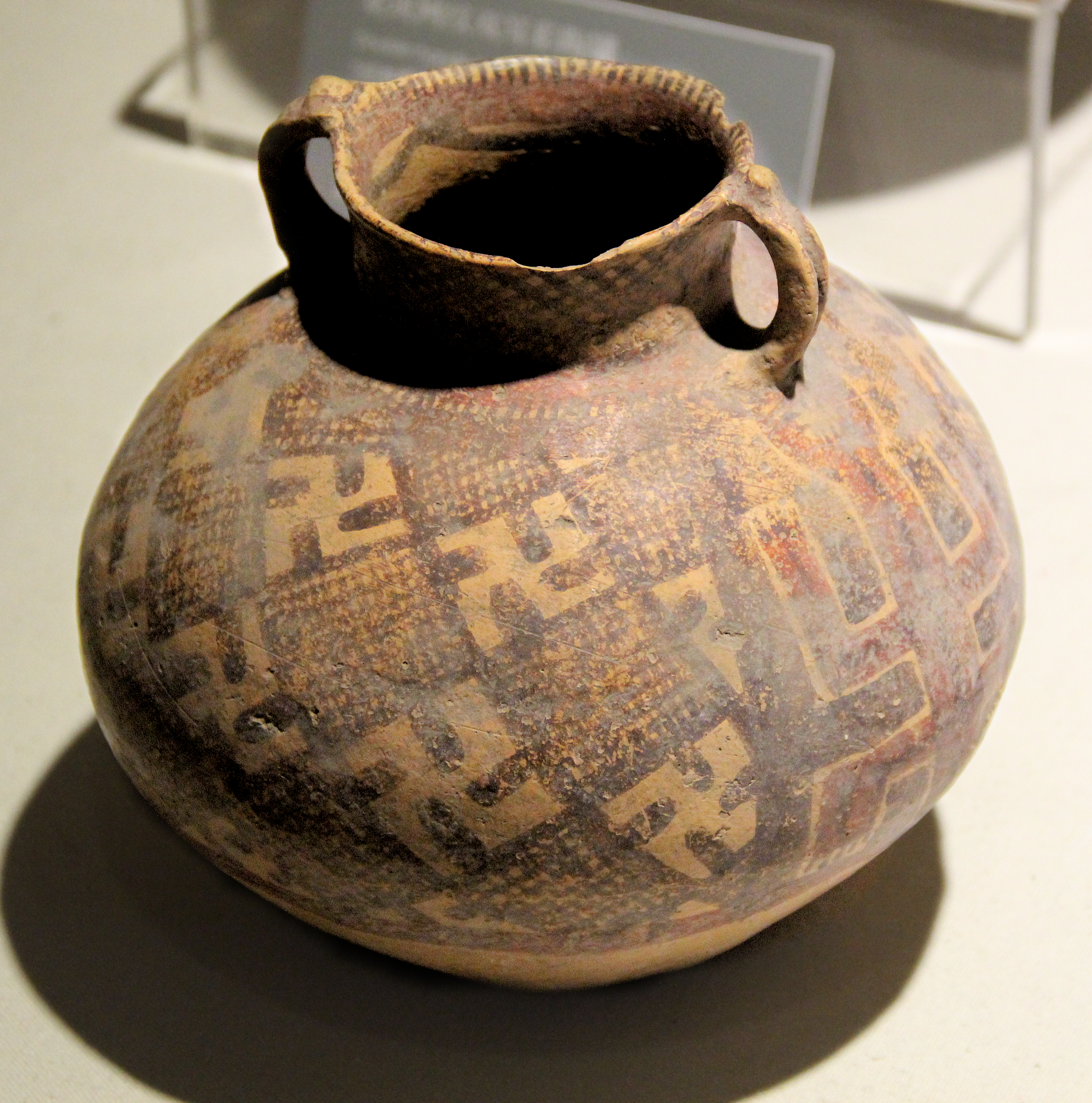
Machang Period Pottery (Swastika symbol)

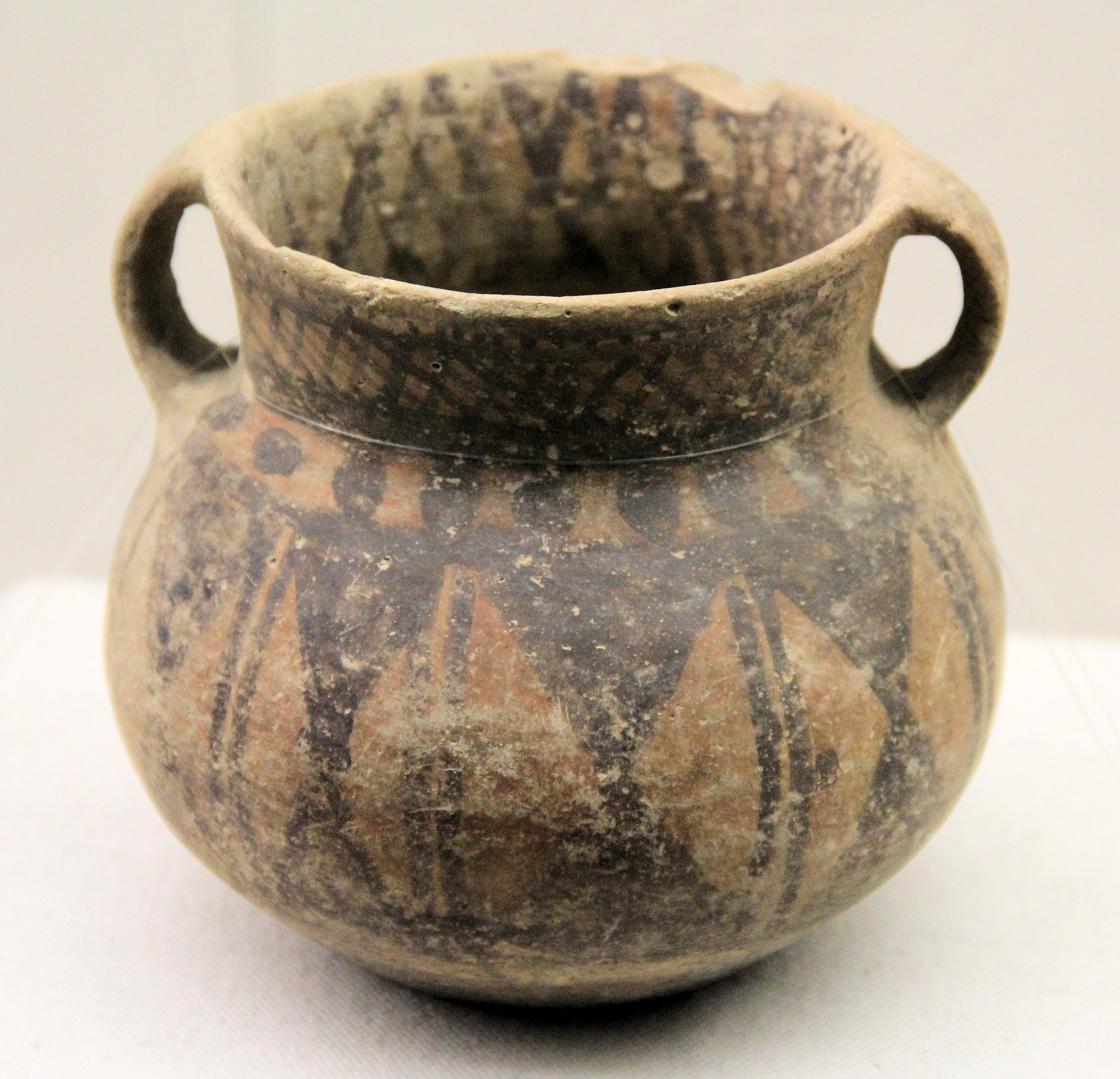
Pot with standing human shapes

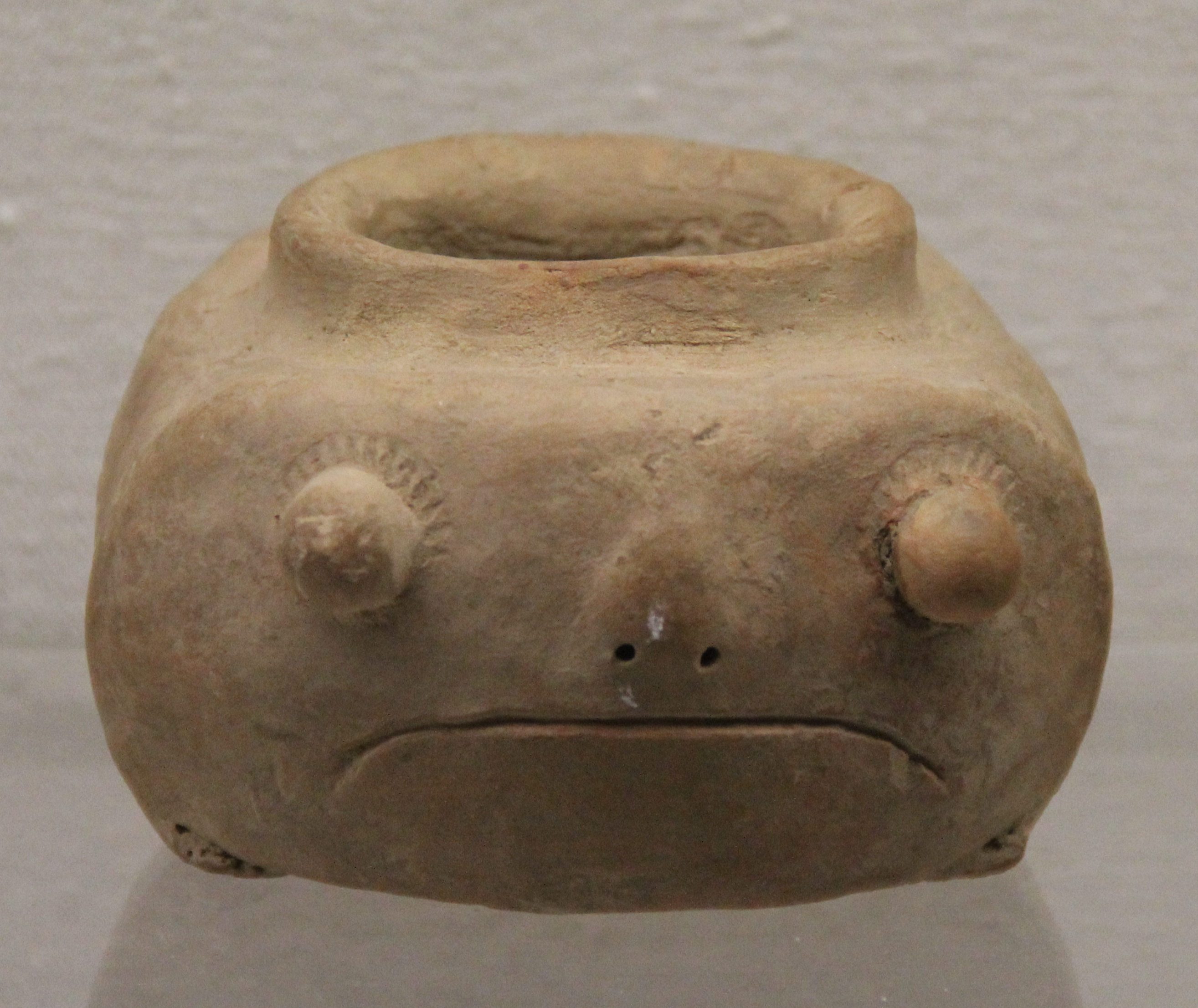
Pot with 3-dimensional humanoid face

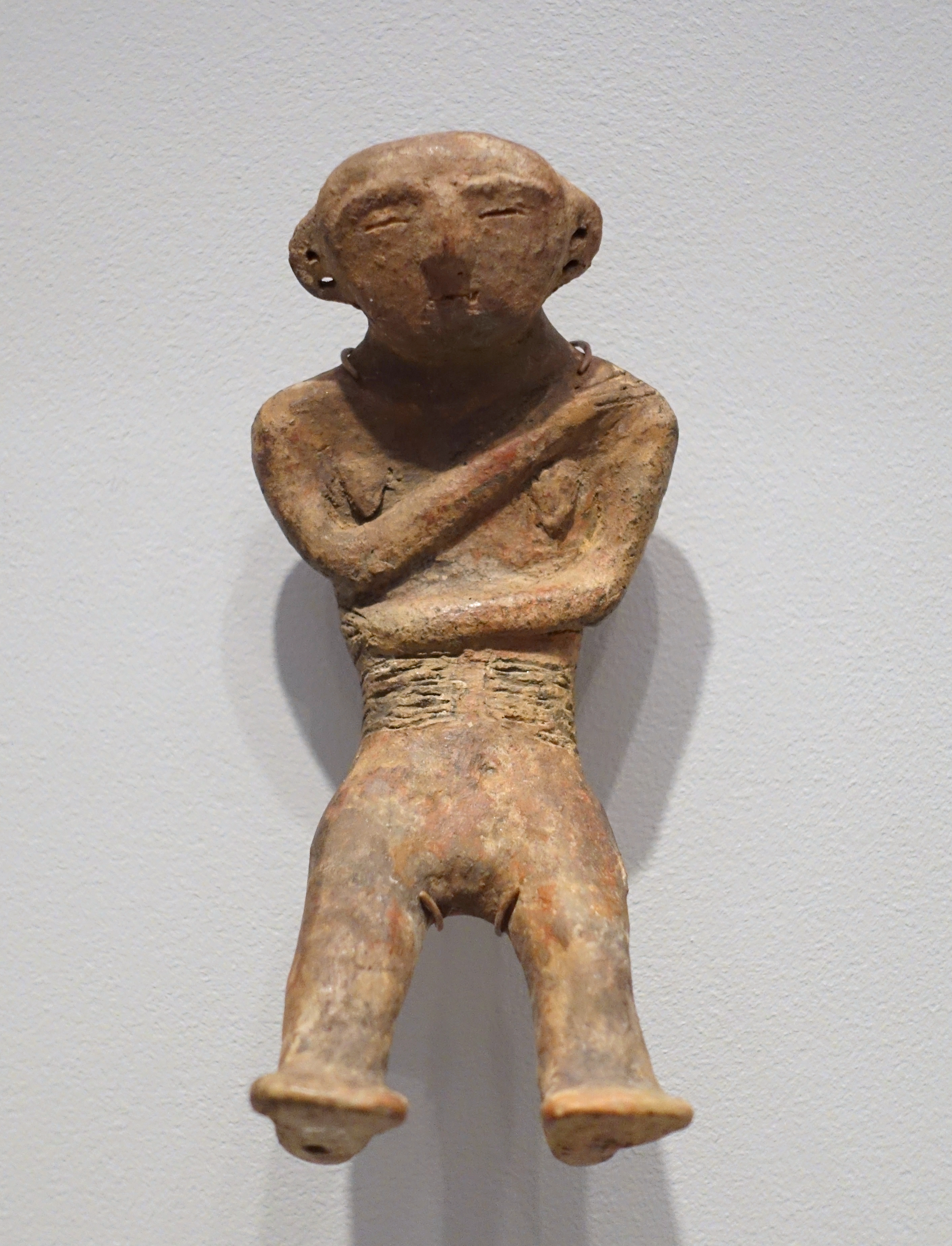
Sculpture of a figure. Machang phase, 2350-2050 BC

== Bronze ==
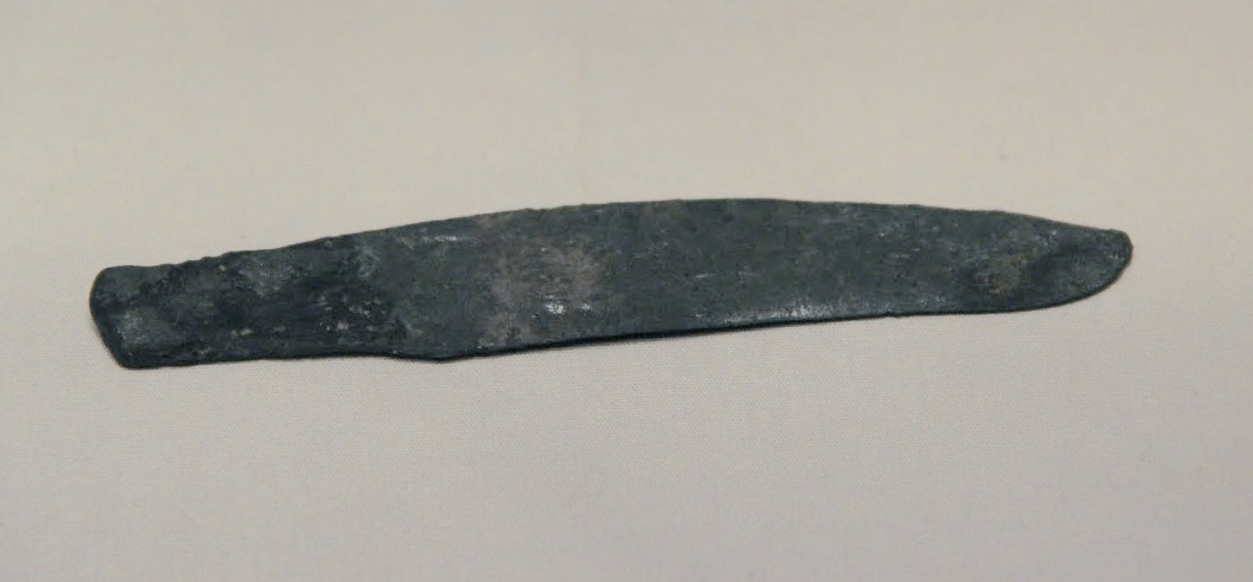
Bronze knife found in Dongxiang, Gansu (dated 2900–2740 BC)

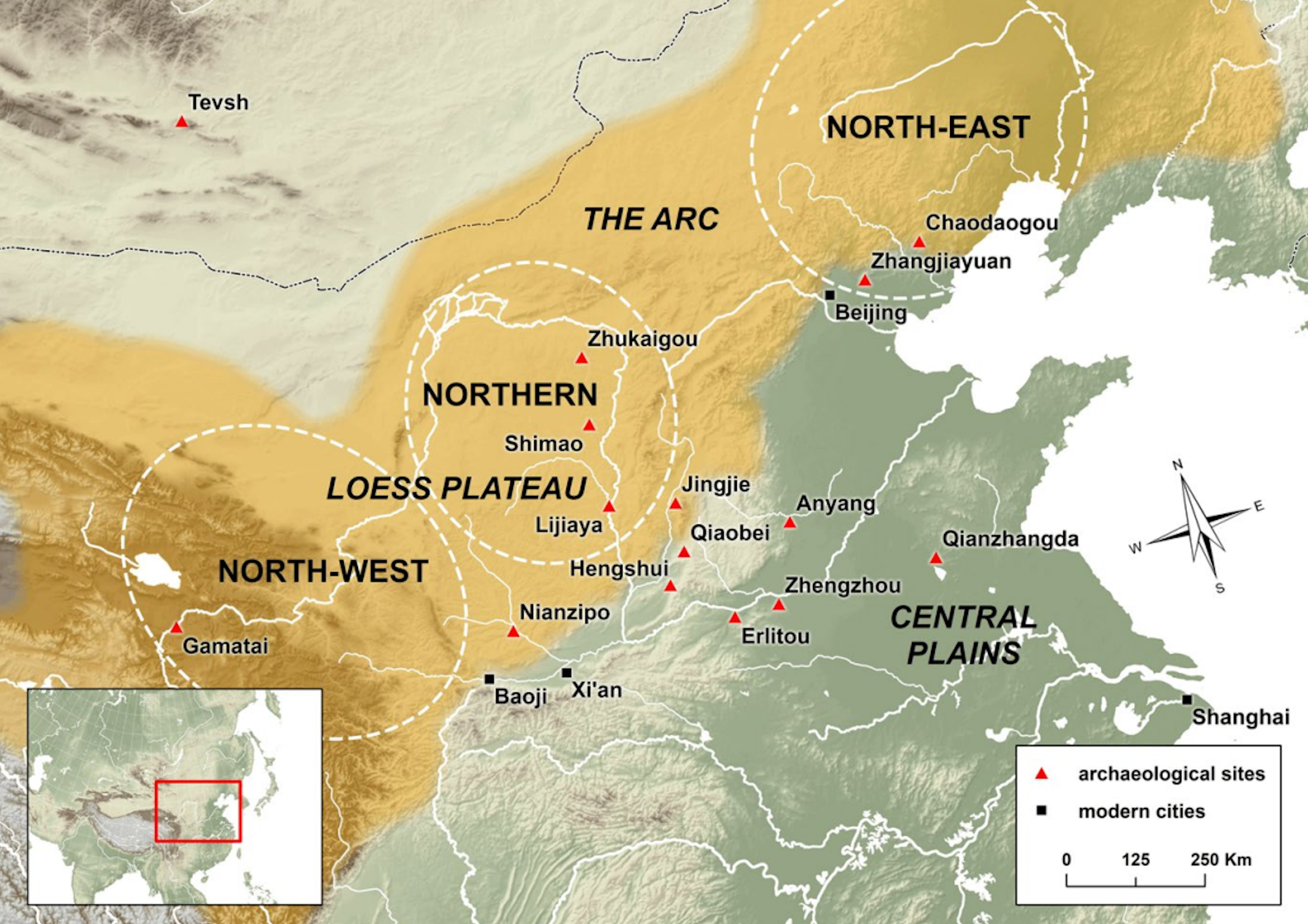
The Majiayao culture was part of the "Arc of the eastern Steppe", next to the Central Plain of China.

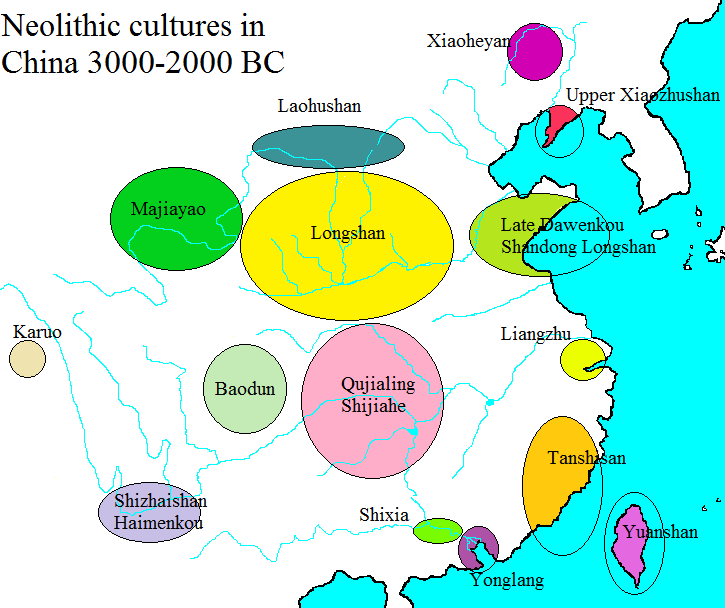
Neolithic cultures in China 3000–2000 BC

Bronze technology was imported to China from the steppes. The oldest bronze object found in China was a knife found at a Majiayao site in Dongxiang, Gansu, and dated to 2900–2740 BC. Further copper and bronze objects have been found at Machang-period sites in Gansu. Metallurgy spread to the middle and lower Yellow River region in the late 3rd millennium BC. Contacts between the Afanasievo culture and the Majiayao culture and the Qijia culture have been considered for the transmission of bronze technology.

== Introduction of pastoralism ==
Domesticated cattle, sheep, and goats first appear in Western Asia circa 8000 BC. Their introduction in China may have been through the Hexi Corridor during the Majiayao culture period, although an alternative may be a route through the Eurasian grasslands and then through the Mongolian plateau circa 3500–2500 BC.

== Climate changes ==
Scholars have come to the conclusion that the development of the Majiayao culture was highly related to climate changes. A group of scholars from Lanzhou University have researched climate changes during the Majiayao culture and the results indicate that the climate was wet during 5830 to 4900 BP, which promoted the development of early and middle Majiayao culture in eastern Qinghai province. However, from 4900 to 4700 BP, the climate underwent droughts in this area, which may be responsible for the decline and eastward movement of prehistoric cultures during the period of transition from early-mid to late Majiayao culture.

The transition from Yangshao to Majiayao coincides, climatically, with the Piora Oscillation.

== See also ==
- History of metallurgy in China
- List of Neolithic cultures of China
- Three Sovereigns and Five Emperors
- Xia dynasty
- Xishanping
