= Ordos culture =

Archaeological culture

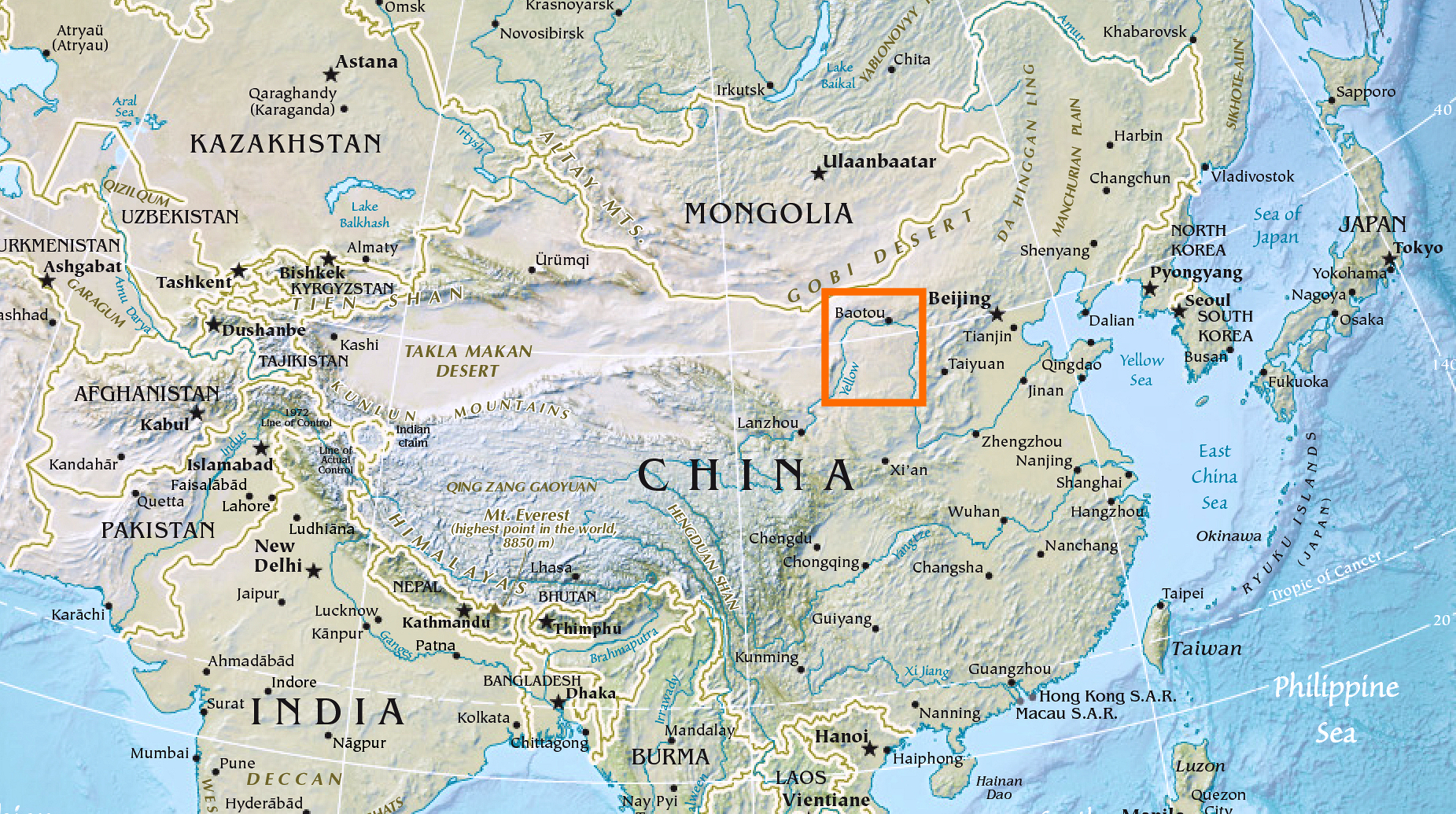
- Geographical range: Ordos Plateau
- Period: late Neolithic to early Bronze Age
- Dates: c. 800–150 BCE
- Preceded by: Zhukaigou culture Shimao culture Siwa culture Xicha culture
- Followed by: Han dynasty

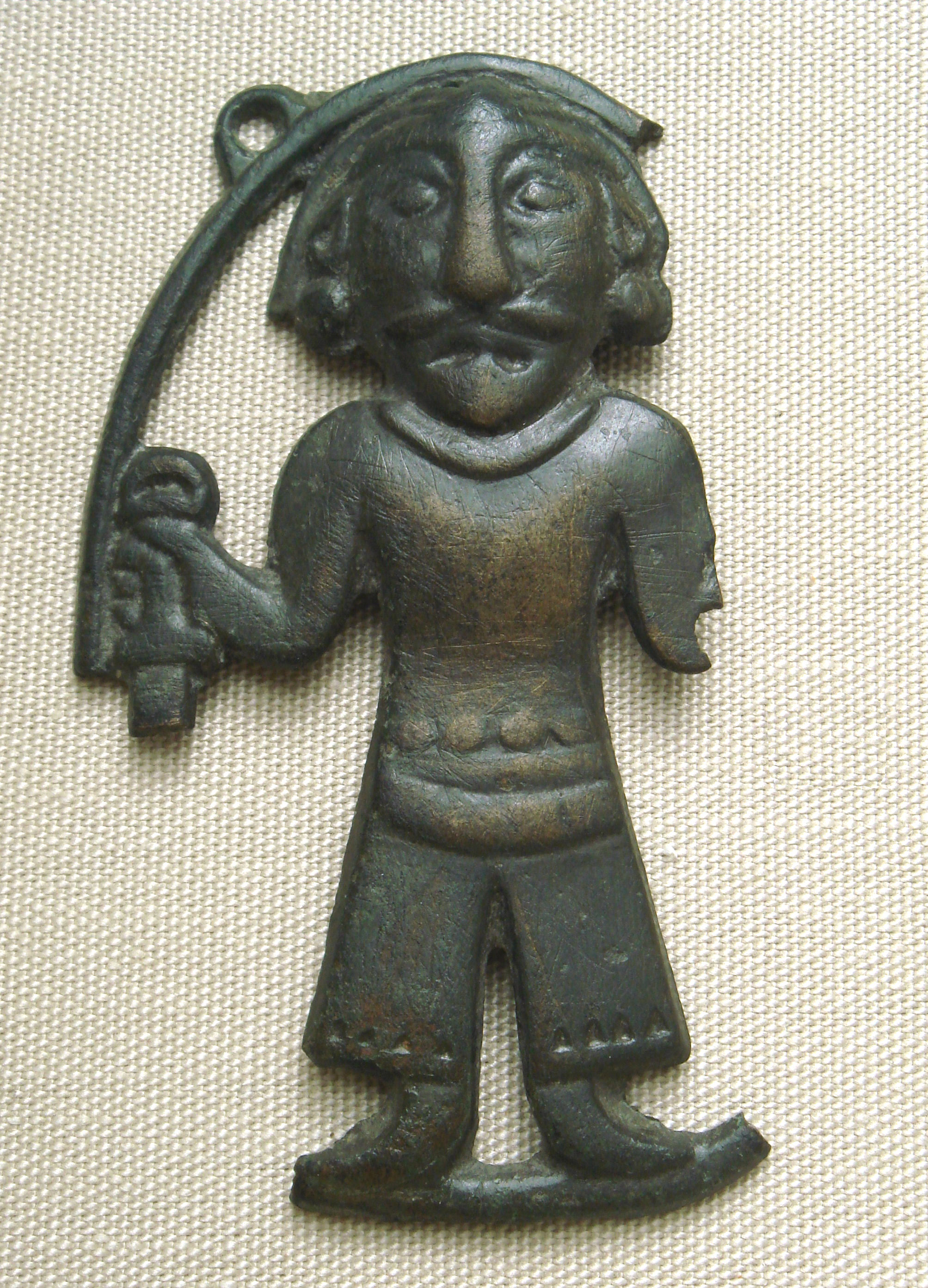
Bronze statuette of a man, Ordos, 3-1st century BCE. British Museum.

The Ordos culture (simplified Chinese: 鄂尔多斯文化; traditional Chinese: 鄂爾多斯文化; pinyin: È'ěrduōsī Wénhuà) was a material culture occupying a region centered on the Ordos Loop (corresponding to the region of Suiyuan, including Baotou to the north, all located in modern Inner Mongolia, China) during the Bronze and early Iron Age from c. 800 BCE to 150 BCE. The Ordos culture is known for significant finds of Scythian art and may represent the easternmost extension of Indo-European Eurasian nomads, such as the Saka, or may be linkable to Palaeo-Siberians or Yeniseians. Under the Qin and Han dynasties, the area came under the control of contemporaneous Chinese states.

== Background ==
The Ordos Plateau was covered by grass, bushes, and trees and was sufficiently watered by numerous rivers and streams to produce rich grazing lands. At the time, it contained the best pasture lands on the Asian Steppe.

Equestrian nomads from the north-west occupied the area previously settled by the Zhukaigou culture and the Shimao culture from the 6th to the 2nd century BCE before being driven away by the Xiongnu. Some authors date the arrival from the north and west of these nomads practicing mounted warfare to the 4th century BC, corresponding roughly to the period of the conquests of Alexander the Great in Central Asia. They came in several waves from Central Asia and Southern Siberia through the Gansu corridor before settling in the Ordos region. They may have interacted with the Yuezhi in the process.

This also roughly corresponds to the period when mounted warfare was introduced in the Chinese state of Zhao, during the Warring States period, by groups called by the Chinese Hu (胡, "Nomads") or Donghu (東胡 "Eastern Nomads") and the Linhu (林胡 "Forest Nomads"), who stimulated the interest of the Zhao king with their "archery from horseback" (騎射 qíshé). Sometimes, Chinese sources clearly differentiated the Hu and the Xiongnu, who consolidated their eastern empire by the end of the 3rd century BC. yet on other occasions Chinese sources often just classified the Xiongnu as a Hu people, which was a blanket term for nomadic people.

== Early characteristics ==
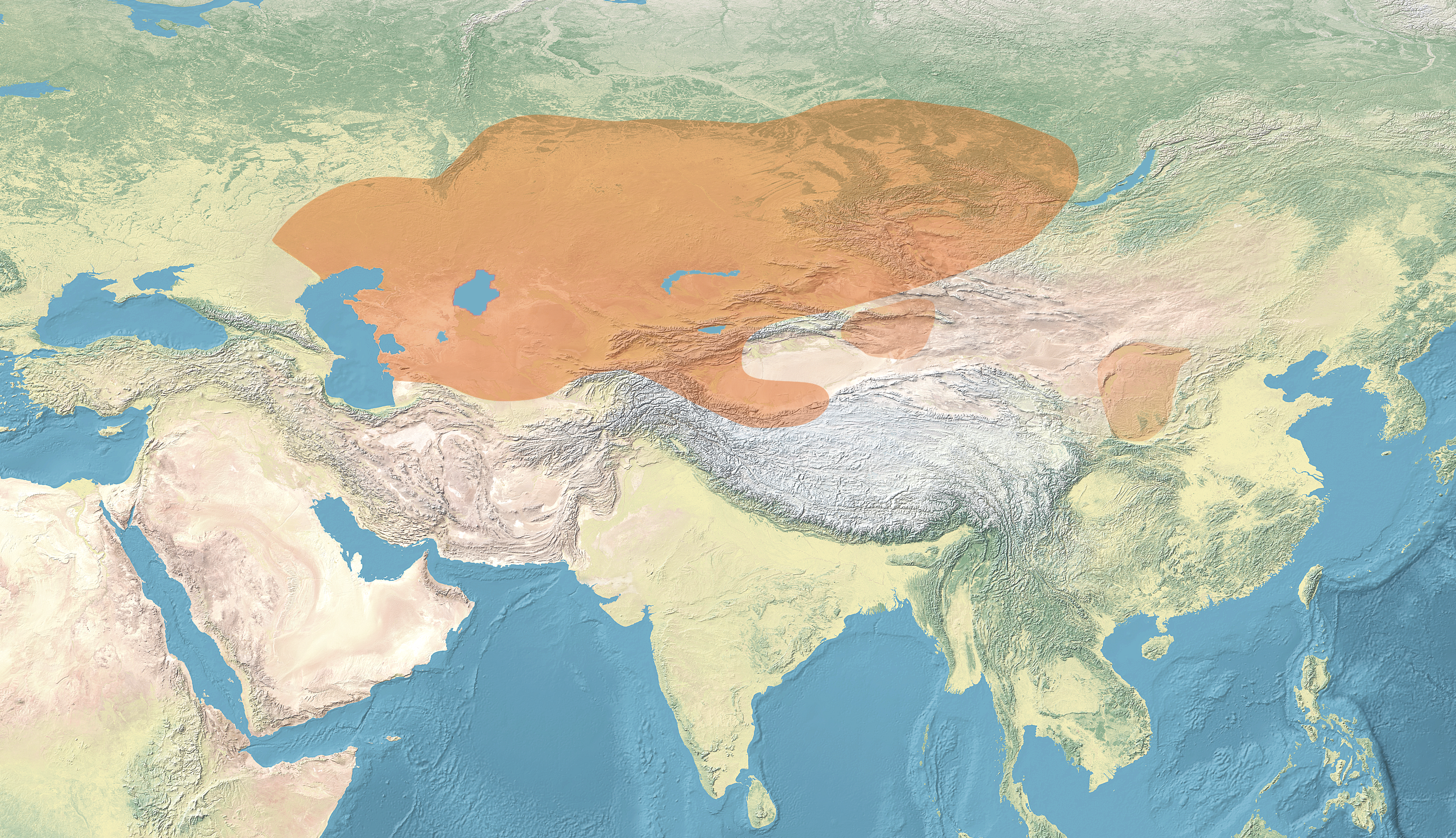
General location of the Ordos culture and the Saka realm ( ), and contemporary Asian polities c. -325

The Ordos are mainly known from their skeletal remains and artifacts. The Ordos culture of about 500 BCE to 100 CE is known for its "Ordos bronzes", blade weapons, finials for tent-poles, horse gear, and small plaques and fittings for clothes and horse harness, using animal style decoration with relationships both with the Scythian art of regions much further west, and also Chinese art. Its relationship with the Xiongnu is controversial; for some scholars they are the same and for others different. Many buried metal artefacts have emerged on the surface of the land as a result of the progressive desertification of the region.

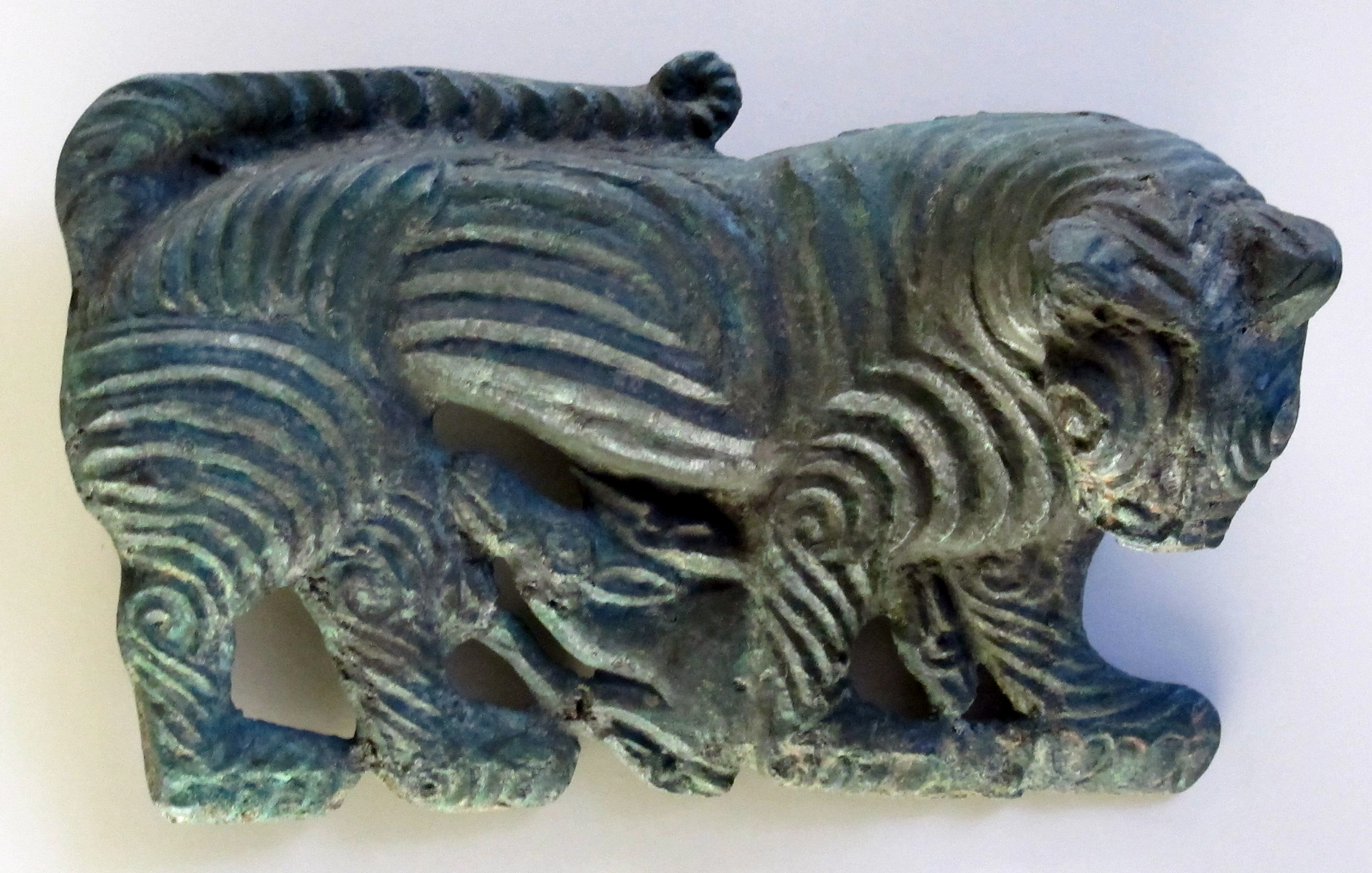
Belt plaque, with a tiger subduing an ibex, Ordos, 6-5th century BCE

The Ordos are thought to be the easternmost of the Iranian peoples of the Eurasian Steppe, just to the east of the better-known Yuezhi, also an Indo-European-speaking people. Because the people represented in archaeological finds tend to display Europoid features, also earlier noted by Otto J. Maenchen-Helfen, Iaroslav Lebedynsky suggests the Ordos culture had "a Scythian affinity". Other scholars have associated it with the Yuezhi or the Palaeo-Siberians (specifically, Yeniseians). The weapons found in tombs throughout the steppes of the Ordos are very close to those of the Scythians and Saka. The Ordos culture has strong similarities with the Shajing culture in Gansu to the west, the Saka culture of the Xinjiang, and the Upper Xiajiadian culture of Liaoning to the northeast.

Recent archeological and genetic data suggests that the Western and Eastern Scythians of the 1st millennium BC originated independently, but both combine Yamnaya-related ancestry, which spread eastwards from the area of the European steppes, with an East Asian-related component, which most closely corresponds to the modern North Siberian Nganasan people of the lower Yenisey River, to varying degrees, but generally higher among Eastern Scythians.

On the other hand, archaeological evidence now tends to suggest that the origins of Scythian culture, characterized by its kurgans burial mounds and its Animal style of the 1st millennium BC, are to be found among Eastern Scythians rather than their Western counterparts: eastern Scythian kurgans (such as the Altaic kurgan Arzhan 1 in Tuva) are older than western Scythian kurgans, and elements of the Animal style are first attested in areas of the Yenisei river and modern-day China in the 10th century BC. The rapid spread of Scythian culture, from the Eastern Scythians to the Western Scythians, is also confirmed by significant east-to-west gene flow across the steppes during the 1st millennium BC.

The Maoqinggou culture at the eastern edge of the Ordos area is also considered as a "Scythian culture", which ultimately disappeared in the 3rd-2nd centuries BCE with the onset of the Xiongnu. Their culture expanded tremendously, and in the northeast of China replaced earlier cultures such as the Upper Xiajiadian.

=== Early bronze artifacts (6-5th century BC) ===
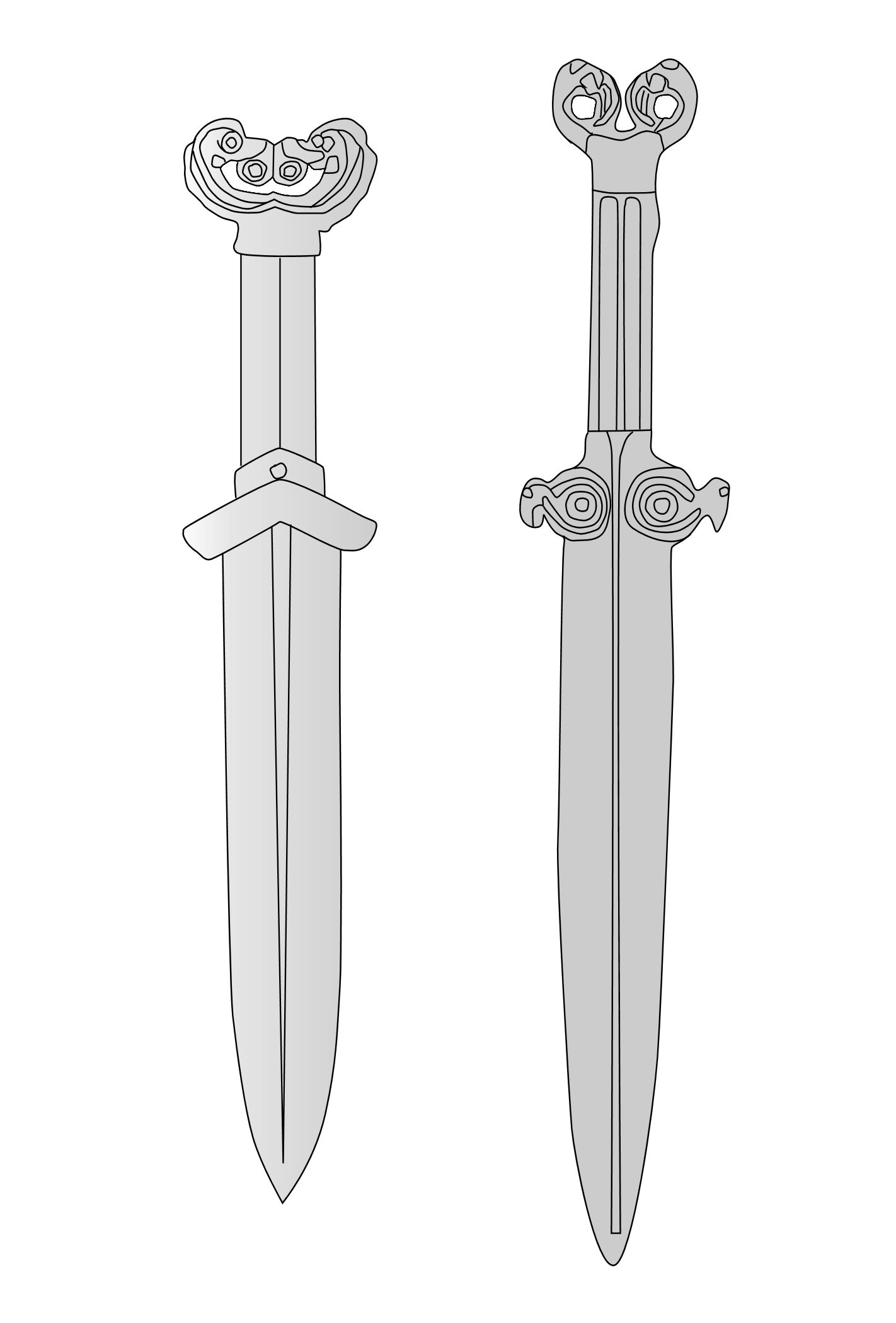
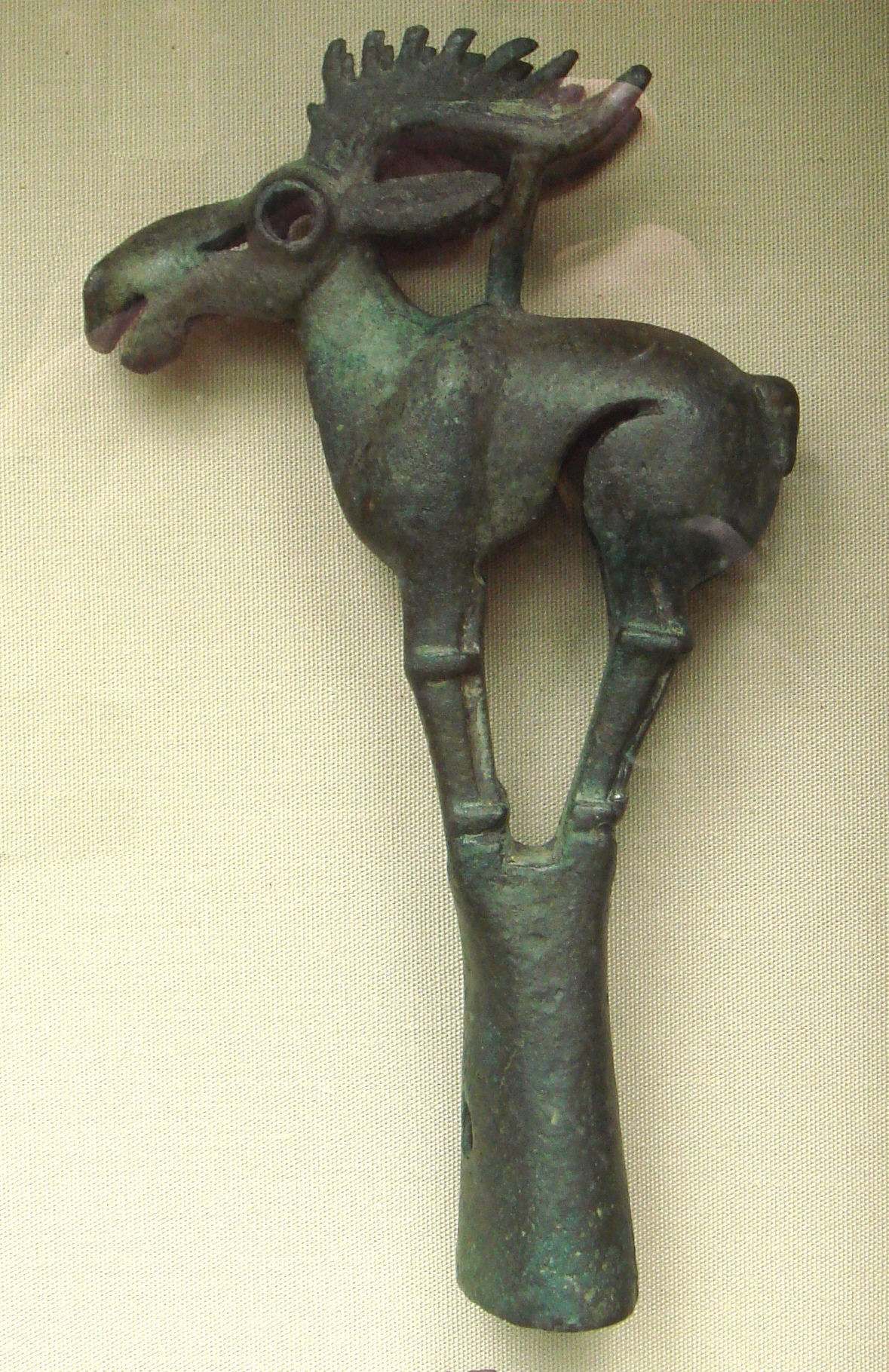
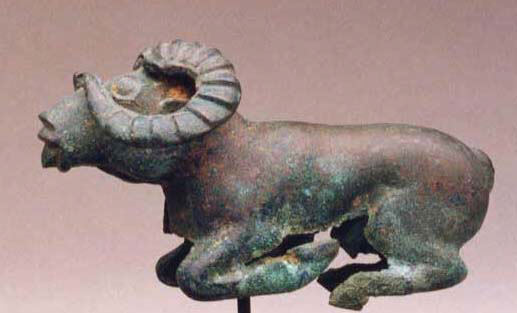
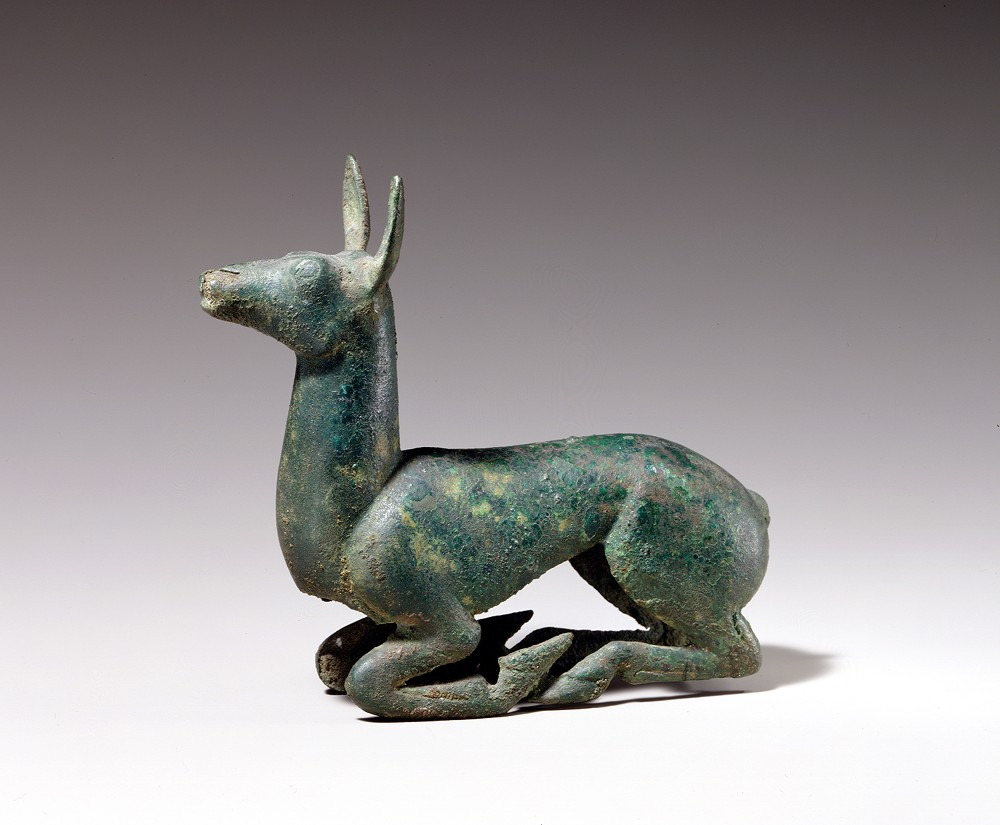
Scythian-style daggers from Maoqinggou, 6th century BC, and chariot yoke ornaments, Ordos, (5-4th century BC) Bronze sword distribution in Bronze culture around Ordos culture

Several Ordos artifacts from the 6-5th century BC reflect a nomadic culture based on the chariot rather than the mounted horse. These include chariot ornaments for chariot yokes, which have been excavated in nomadic tombs.

The material used was bronze, in contrast to the silver and gold which appeared from the 4th century BC, together with the mounted-horse culture. Chariot ornaments disappeared from graves around that time. The artifacts were probably created in the foundries of the pre-Dynastic State of Qin for the nomadic herders of the Ordos.

In Northeast Asia, adjacent to the Ordos-style bronze dagger culture are the Liaoning-style bronze dagger and the Slender bronze dagger, which influence each other. Influenced by the Ordos-style bronze dagger, the Antenna-style bronze dagger was established in South Manchuria, Korea, and Northern Kyushu.

=== Introduction of new metallurgy and style (4th-3rd century BC) ===
Around the 4th century BC, grave goods starting to change markedly. The chariot, which had been a central funerary artifact among nomadic people, was replaced by the horse. The iconography of grave artifacts became clearly derived from Altaic or Northern Asian motifs. The new iconography of this period, combined with the fact that it first appears in southern Ningxia and southeastern Gansu to the west of the Ordos, suggests that these horse-mounted nomads came from Northern Asia and southern Siberia through Gansu, probably in several waves.

Gold and silver replaced tinned bronze. A Gold stag with eagle's head found at the southern edge of the Ordos desert exemplifies the new "intrusive style" introduced by the Ordos nomads. The motif of the "raptor-headed creature" is earlier documented from the Pazyryk culture, and is part of a Eurasian symbolic system known from around the 7th century BC and identified in Saka burial sites. A nomadic gold crown was also excavated in the Ordos, and dated to the 3rd century BC. New techniques such as granulation were also introduced from the west across Eurasia and would then be adopted by China.

These artifacts, such as those depicting raptor-headed mythological creatures, are often attributed to the Xiongnu, but this is an impossibility since the Xiongnu were not yet in the region in the 4th century BCE and could not have imported these designs to northwestern China, and furthermore these styles actually disappeared soon after the arrival of the Xiongnu. They should instead be attributed to the pre-Xiongnu nomads would occupied the Ordos at that time, including possibly the Yuezhi.

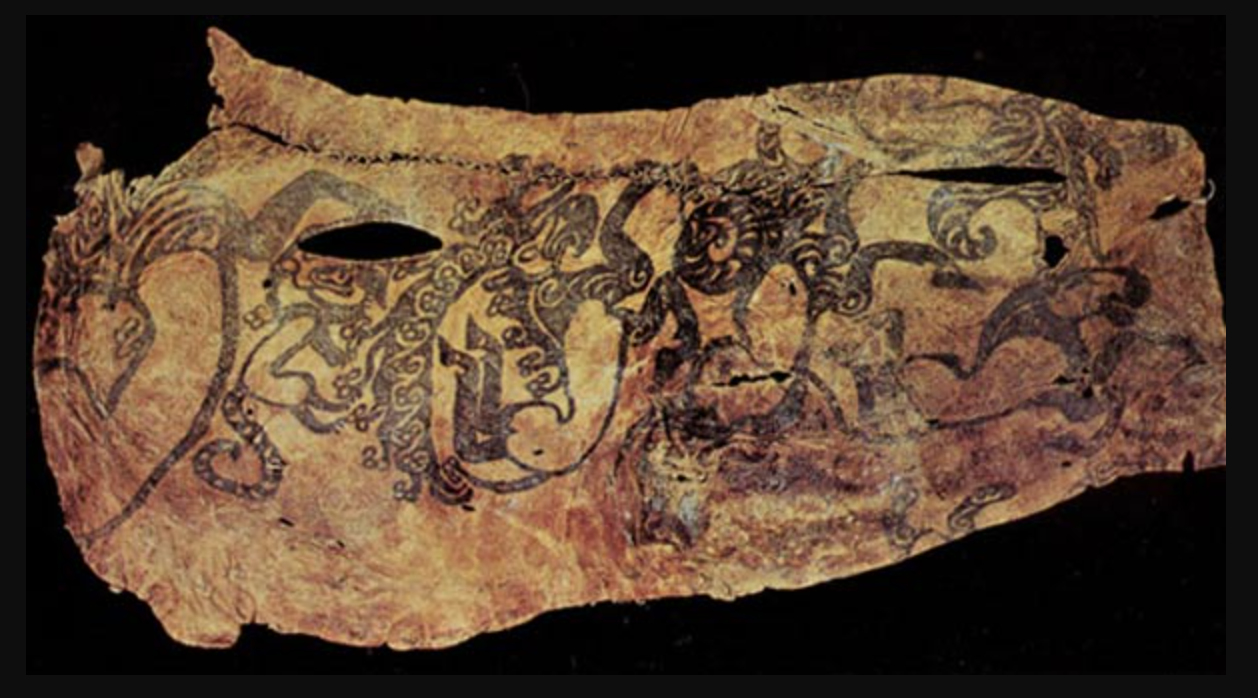
Pazyryk tattoo design with zoomorphic symbols, 4th century BC. A precursor of the new Ordos designs.

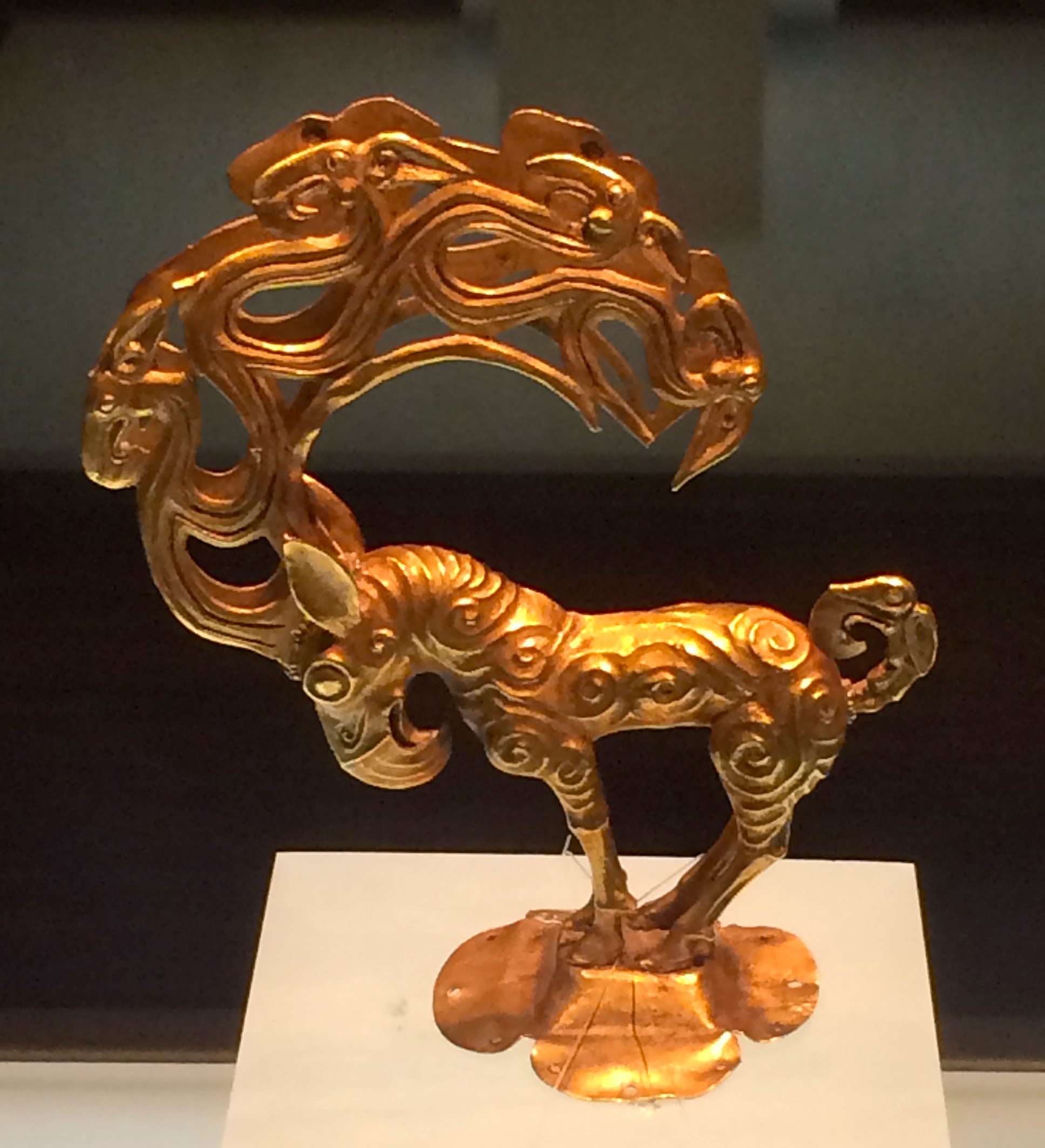
Gold stag with eagle's head, characteristic of the new style introduced by the Ordos nomads. Excavated at the southern border of the Ordos desert.

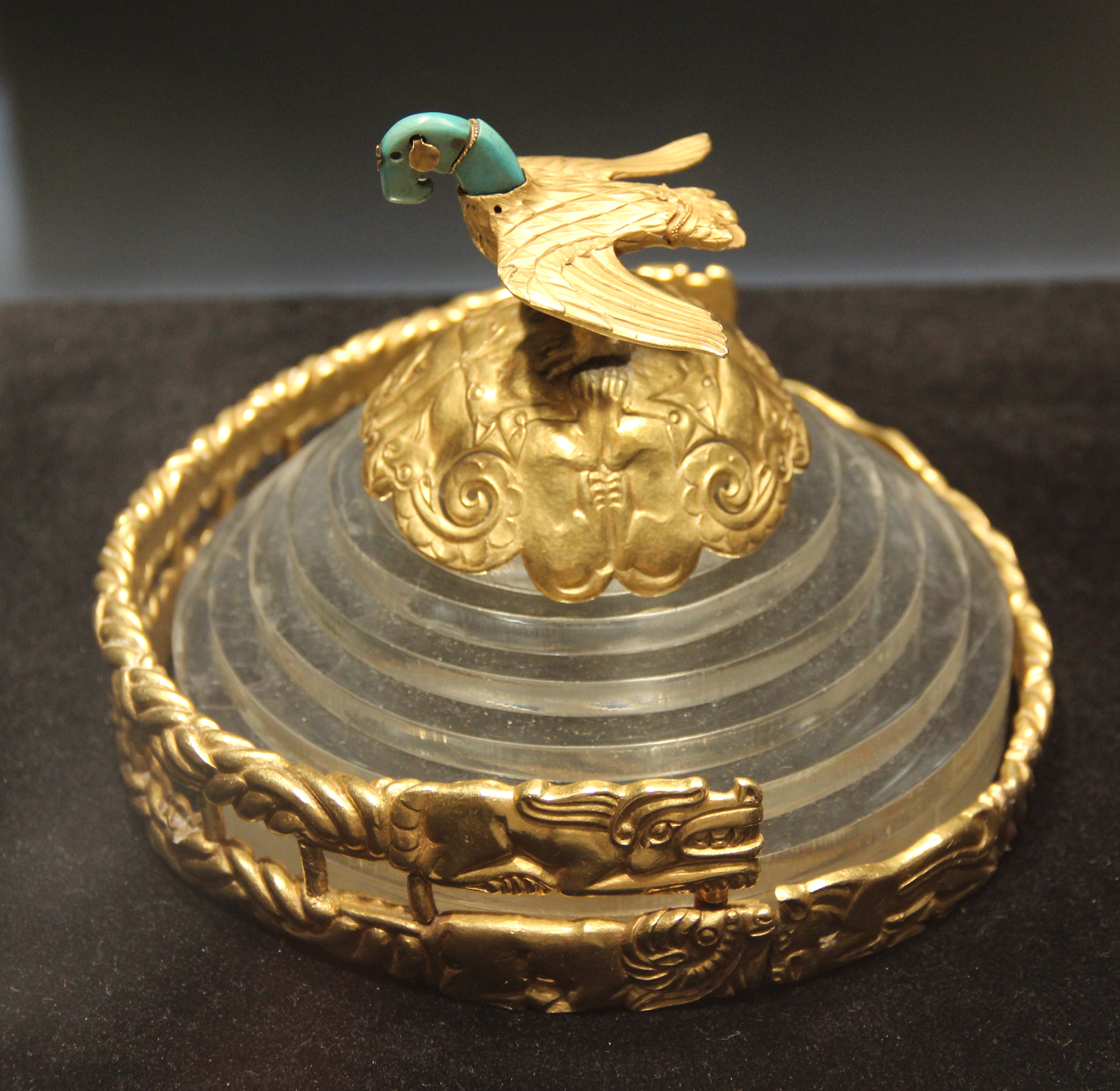
Nomadic gold crown excavated in the Ordos, 3rd century BC

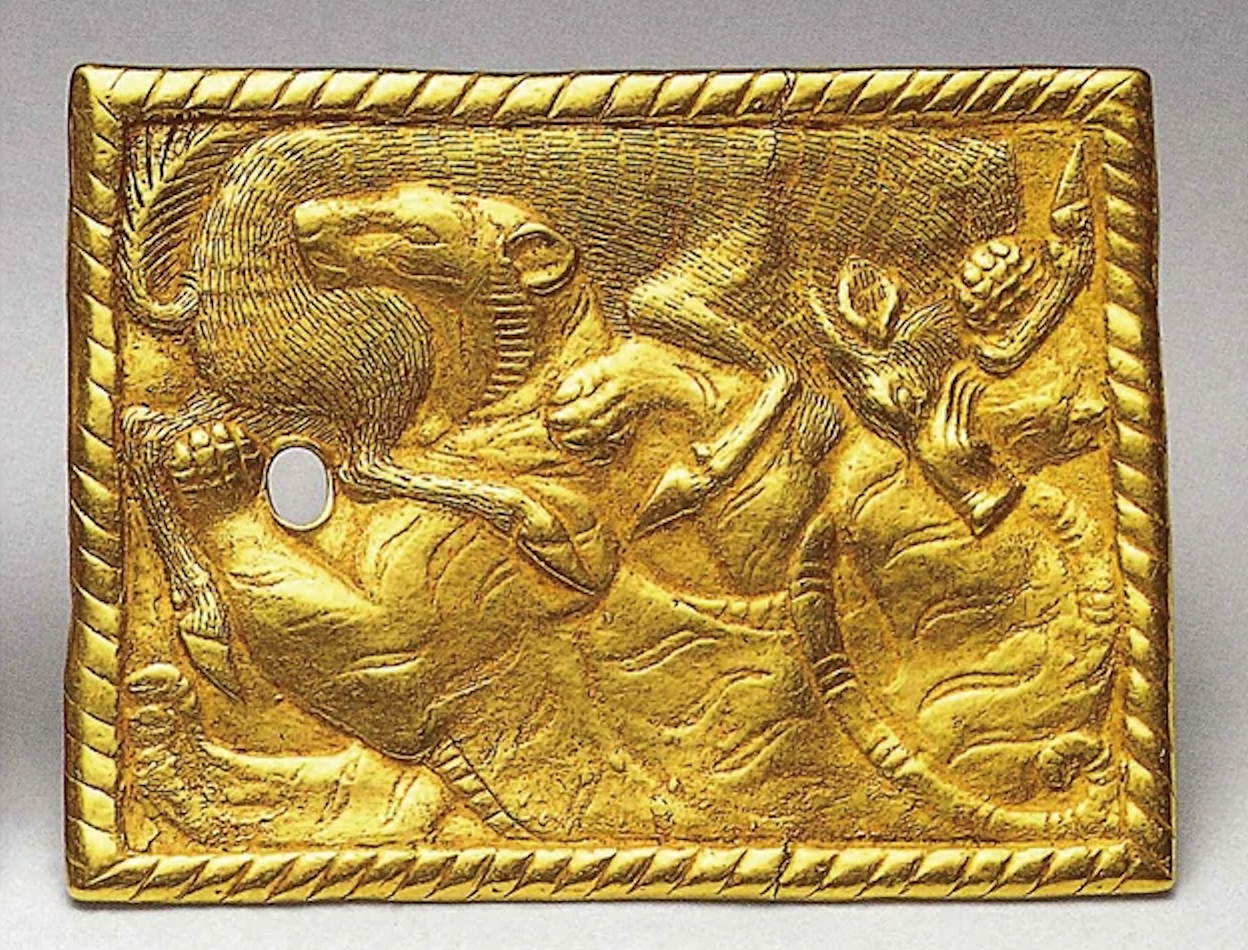
Gold belt buckle in Scythian style, from Xigoupan M2 (4th–3rd c. BCE)

== Contact with neighbouring peoples ==
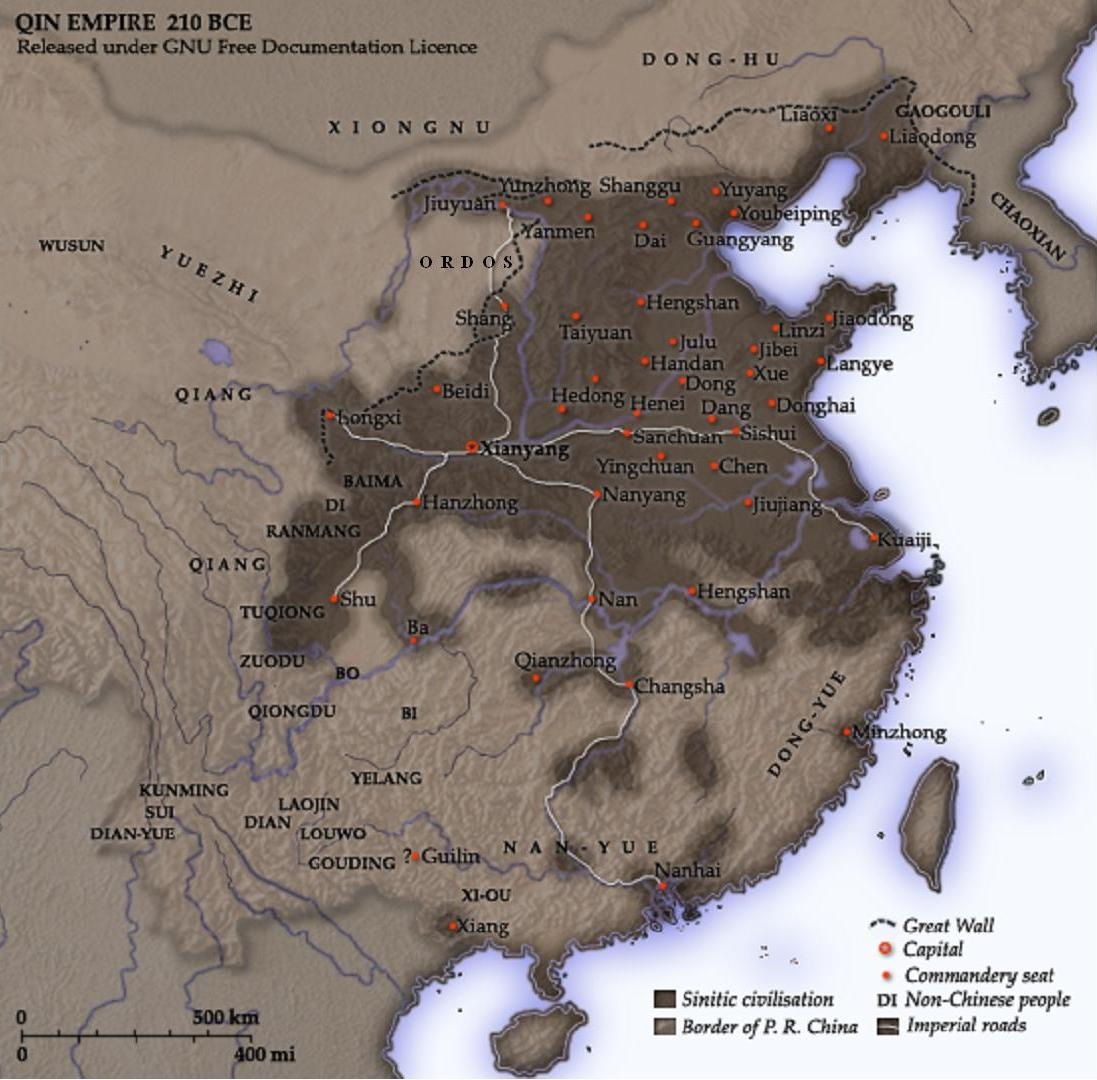
The Ordos people were located at the doorstep of Qin China, and were just east of the Yuezhi in the 3rd century BCE.

While the ethnolinguistic origins and character of the Ordos culture are unknown, the population appears to have been significantly influenced by Indo-European cultures. However, the art of the Ordos culture appears to have similarities to that of the Donghu people (Chinese: 東胡), a Mongolic-speaking nomadic tribe located to the east, suggesting that the two had close ties.

The Ordos population was also in contact – and reportedly often at war – with the pre-Han and Han peoples. The Ordos culture covered, geographically, regions later occupied by the Han, including areas just north of the later Great Wall of China and straddling the northernmost hook of the Yellow River.

To the west of the Ordos culture was another Indo-European people, the Yuezhi, although nothing is known of relations between the two. (The Yuezhi were later vanquished by the Xiongnu and Wusun, who reportedly drove them westward, out of China; a subgroup of the Yuezhi is widely believed to have migrated to South Central Asia, where it constituted the ruling elite of the Kushan Empire.)

== Arrival of the Xiongnu (circa 160 BC) ==
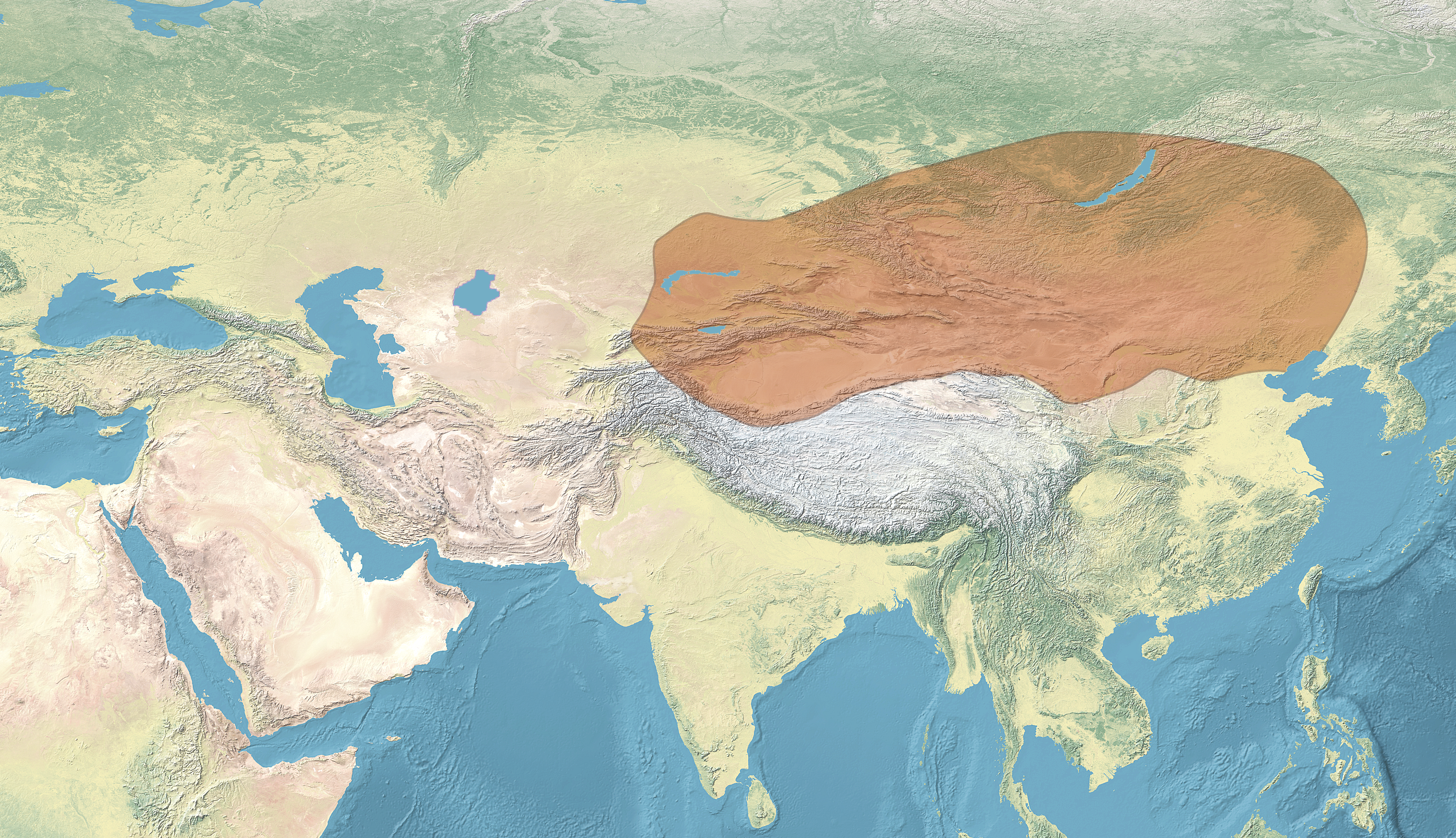
Territory of the Xiongnu in the 2nd century BC (before the Han–Xiongnu War of 133 BC – 89 AD): includes Mongolia, East Kazakhstan, East Kyrgyzstan, South Siberia, and parts of northern China including Western Manchuria, Xinjiang, Inner Mongolia and Gansu.

The Xiongnu's early appearance was recorded north of Wild Goose Gate and Dai commanderies before 265 BCE, just before the Zhao-Xiongnu War; however, sinologist Edwin Pulleyblank (1994) contends that pre-241-BCE references to the Xiongnu are anachronistic substitutions for the Hu people instead. They are also mentioned in Chinese sources, official ones like Records of the Grand Historian, and unofficial ones like Yi Zhou Shu and Classic of Mountains and Seas as having occupied the Ordos plateau during the Warring States period before it was occupied by the states of Qin and Zhao. It is generally thought to be their homeland; however, when exactly they came to occupy the region is unclear and archaeological finds suggest it might have been much earlier than traditionally thought. The Xiongnu regained their homeland up to China's borders, more than ten years after their expulsion, during the post-Qin chaos when Meng Tian had died and convicts stationed to guard the borders returned home.

As the Xiongnu expanded southward into Yuezhi territory around 160 BCE under Modun, the Yuezhi in turn defeated the Sakas and pushed them away at Issyk Kul. It is thought the Xiongnu also occupied the Ordos area during the same period, when they came in direct contact with the Chinese. From there, the Xiongnu conducted numerous devastating raids into Chinese territory (167, 158, 142, 129 BCE).

The Han–Xiongnu War began with Emperor Gaozu of Han, and the Han colonized the area of the Ordos as the commandery of Shuofang in 127 BCE. Prior to this campaign, there were already earlier commanderies established by Qin and Zhao before they were overrun by the Xiongnu in 209 BCE.

=== Xiongnu period artifacts ===
Belt plaques in the shape of a kneeling horse in gilded silver, were made in North China for Xiongnu patrons in 3rd-1st century BCE. Belt buckles with animal combat scenes were made in the 2nd-1st century BCE, mainly by North China workshops for the Xiongnu. These plates were inspired by the art of the steppes, but the design was flattened and compressed within the frame.

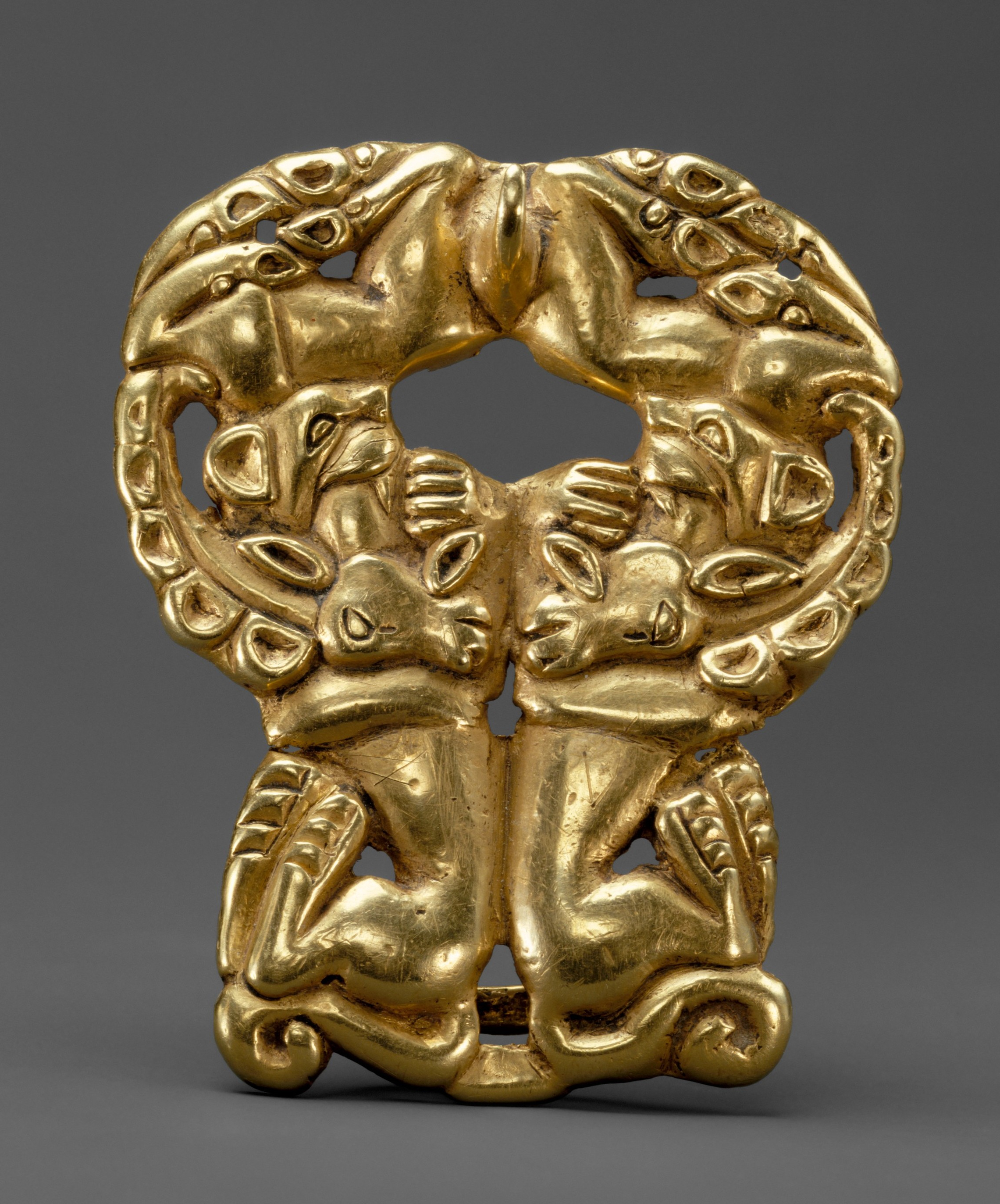
Belt buckle with paired felines attacking ibexes, derived from earlier Scythian art. Ordos, 3rd century BC. Usually described as Xiongnu despite early date.

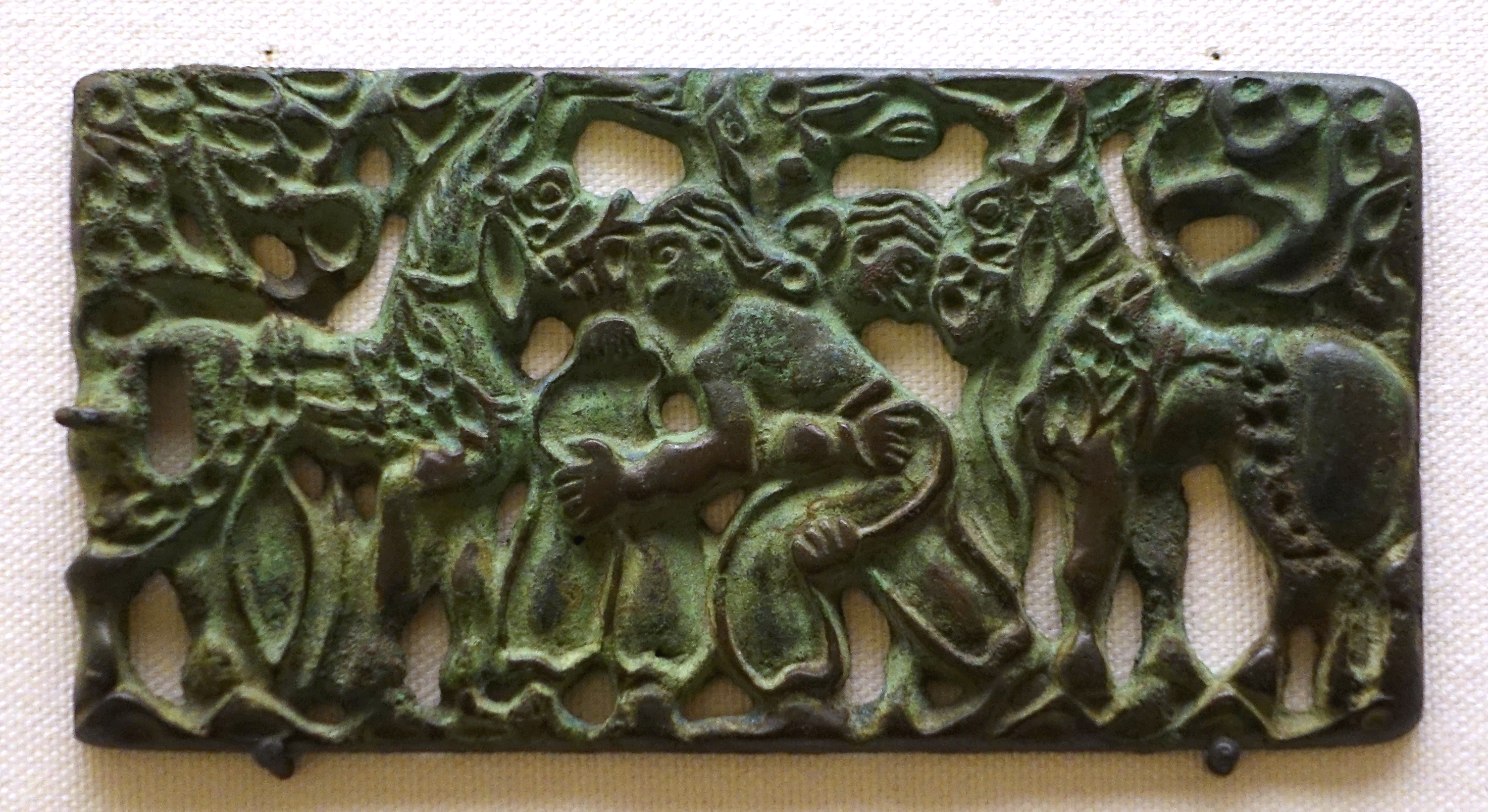
Belt plaque with design of wrestling men, Ordos region and western part of North China, 2nd century BC, bronze - Ethnological Museum, Berlin

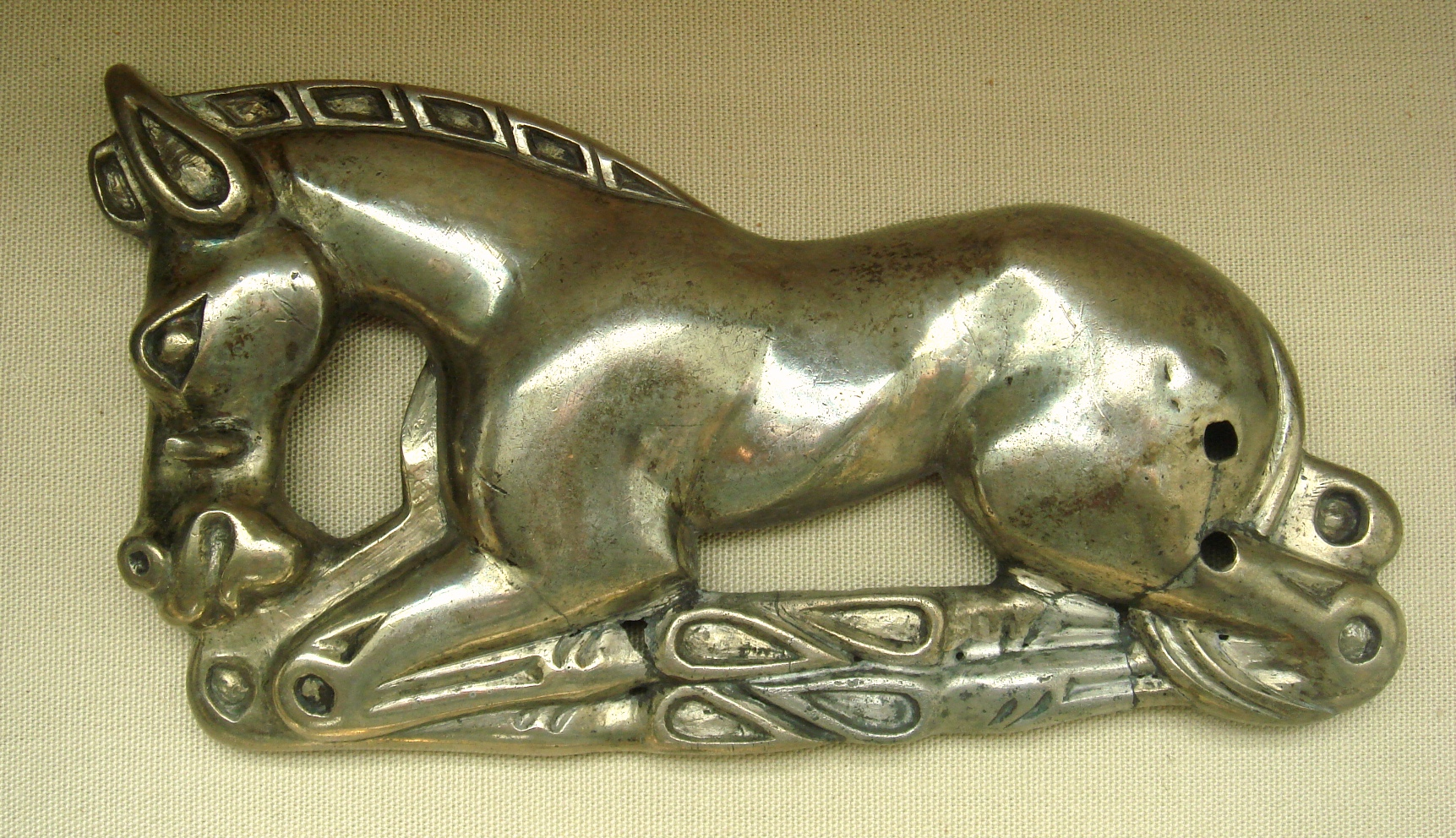
Silver horse, Ordos, 4th–1st century BCE

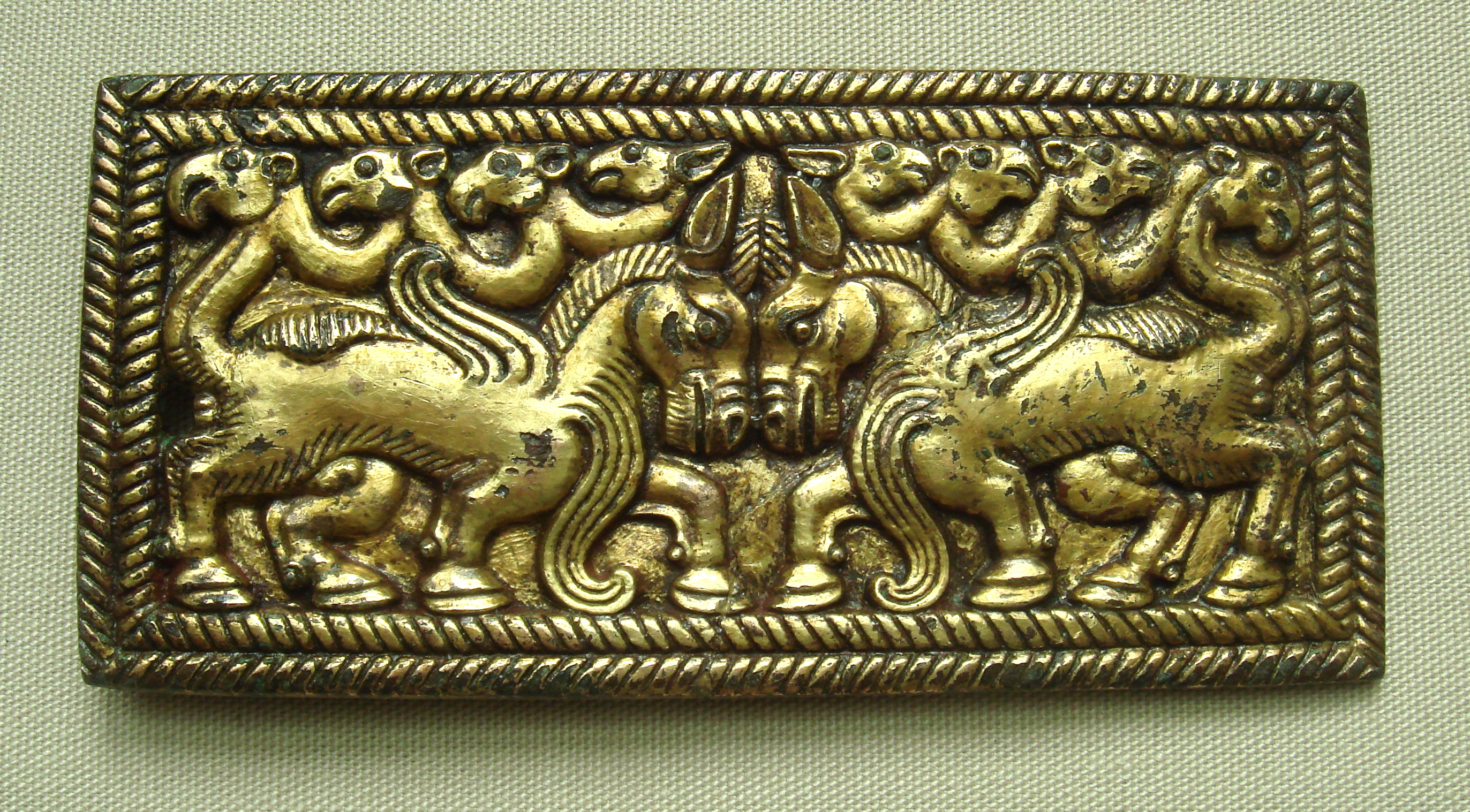
Belt buckle, Ordos, 3rd–1st century BCE

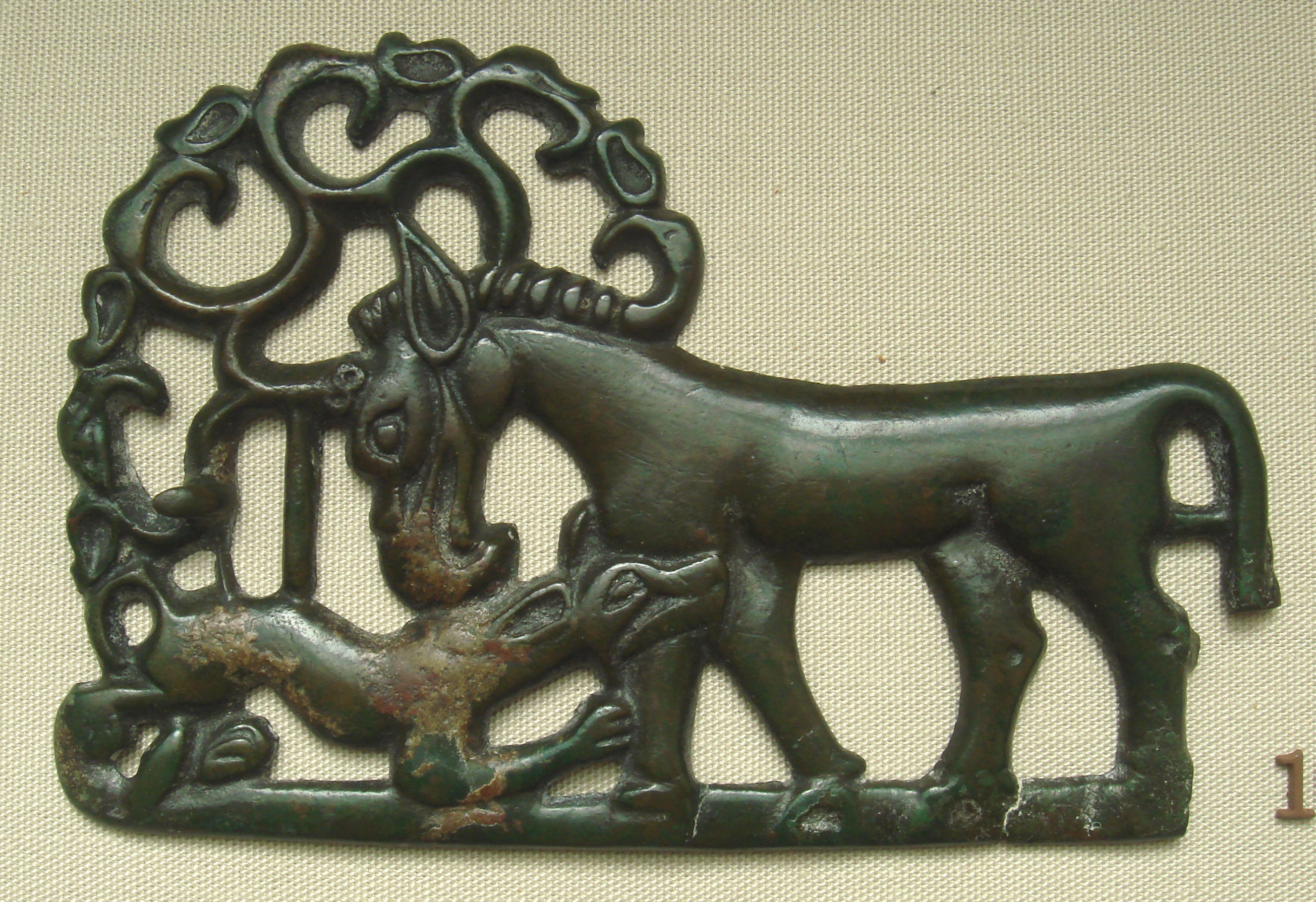
Horse attacked by tiger, Ordos, 4th-1st century BCE
