= Zhukaigou culture =

Culture in Inner Mongolia, China (c. 2000 – c. 1400 BC)

- Geographical range: Ordos Plateau
- Period: late Neolithic to early Bronze Age
- Dates: c. 2000 – c. 1400 BC
- Followed by: Xicha culture Ordos culture

Chinese name
- Chinese: 朱開溝文化
Transcriptions
Standard Mandarin
- Hanyu Pinyin: Zhūkāigōu wénhuà

The Zhukaigou culture was a late Neolithic and early Bronze Age culture centered in the Ordos Plateau of Inner Mongolia, China. The type site at Zhukaigou was discovered in Ejin Horo Banner, Inner Mongolia, and excavated from 1977 to 1984. Zhukaigou culture is a reputed progenitor of the Ordos bronze culture and accordingly a first "Northern Zone" culture, extending to northern and central Inner Mongolia, northern Shaanxi, and northern Shanxi, with the Ordos region at its center. Transition to metalworking is dated to around the end of the third millennium BCE, at the same time was attained a higher level in the ceramic. Zhukaigou culture lasted to c. 1500 BCE.

The culture appears to have begun as one of hunter-gatherers, followed by an agricultural phase, which following environmental degradation and perhaps the domestication of the horse, increasingly depended on pastoralism, perhaps the nomadic pastoralism of the succeeding Ordos culture.

The Zhukaigou culture is associated with about 327 burials, with recent maternal genetic evidence showing that they were related to the remains from Yinniugou, as well as modern populations like Daurs and Evenks. The archaeological finds at the site are similar to those of the lower Xiajiadian culture. These finds are important, as they are associated with the development of snake pattern designs on the decoration of weapon and animal-depicting artifacts, which later would become a characteristic style of the Ordos.

Archaeologists have divided the culture into five phases, corresponding with the late stage of the Longshan culture, the early, middle and late stages of the Erlitou culture, and the early stage of the Erligang culture. The early phase of the culture was influenced by the Longshan culture, while the middle phases were influenced by the Qijia culture; it was during this time frame when bronze artefacts begin to appear in the material culture. At this point, Zhukaigou people were agriculturalists, with millet as a main staple; they also had sheep, pigs, and cattle.

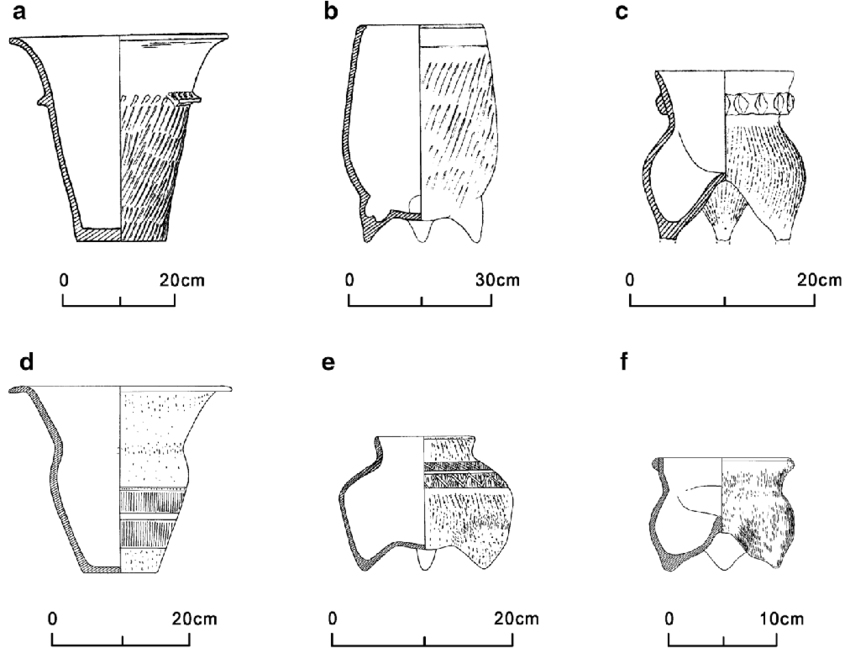
Characteristic ceramics of the Shimao-Zhukaigou tradition that were also found in Western Zhou tombs, most especially those of consorts of the Jin and Peng lords

By the second millennium BC, the Zhukaigou people started using oracle-bone divination, a practice that was closely associated with Shang culture and statecraft. Shang-type artifacts suggest that around the mid-second millennium BCE increased contacts between the local Zhukaigou people and the Shang, or that the Shang culture extended northward. Shang ritual vessels, such as ding and jue, and weapons appear there during the Erlitou (2100–1800 [1500?] BCE) and Erligang (c. 1500–1,400 BCE) periods.

Bronze objects dated to the last period of existence of Zhukaigou culture c. 1500 BCE point to native production of a mixed complex of bronze objects that included typical "Northern Zone" items like daggers, with typical Shang ge (戈) dagger-axes, and knives that reveal both Shang and northern features.

In the late period of Zhukaigou culture, c. 1,500 BCE, motifs like snake patterns and the flower-shaped edge of the li (鬲) vessel appeared, which archaeologists regard as characteristic of later nomadic peoples of this area. During the last phase of the Zhukaigou culture, the former practice of sheep and pig sacrifices was gradually being replaced by the practice of dog sacrifices.

== See also ==
General location of the Zhukaigou culture, and contemporary Asian polities c. 2000 BCE

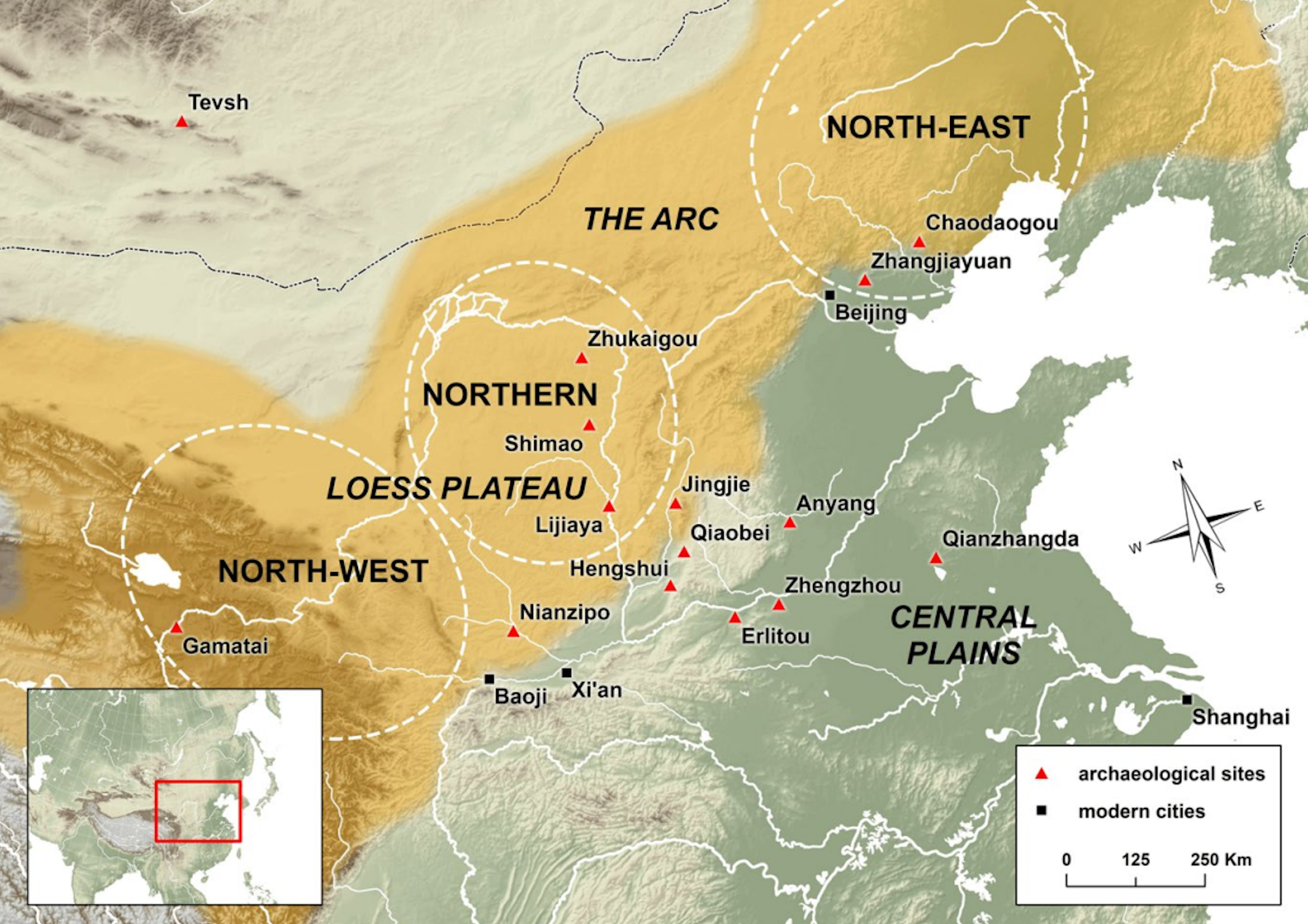
The Zhukaigou culture was part of the "Arc of the eastern Steppe", next to the Central Plain of China.

- Lower Xiajiadian culture
- Ordos culture
- Shimao
