= Xicha culture =

Culture of Inner Mongolia and Greater Ordos

- Geographical range: Ordos Plateau
- Period: Bronze Age
- Dates: c.1300 – c.1000 BC
- Preceded by: Zhukaigou culture
- Followed by: Ordos culture

The Xicha culture, also Xicha-Lijiaya culture was a culture of Inner Mongolia and Greater Ordos area, from 1300 BCE to 1000 BCE. It succeeded the Zhukaigou culture, and preceded the Bronze Age Ordos culture.

Archaeological finds corresponding to this culture are rather abundant, with tombs, ceramics, settlements, and bronze atifacts. The Xicha culture already used mold for casting bronze objects and weapons.

== Sources ==
- Honeychurch, William (2015). Inner Asia and the Spatial Politics of Empire: Archaeology, Mobility, and Culture Contact (PDF). doi:10.1007/978-1-4939-1815-7.
- Sun, Yan (2017). "Identity and Artifacts on the North Central and Northeastern Frontier during the Period of State Expansion in the Late Second and the Early First Millennium BCE". Ancient China and its Eurasian Neighbors: Artifacts, Identity and Death in the Frontier, 3000–700 BCE. Cambridge University Press. pp. 72–145. ISBN 978-1-108-41861-4.
