= Maoqinggou culture =

Bronze Age culture of inner Mongolia, china

Coordinates: 40.494639°N 112.282238°E

- Maoqinggou culture and contemporary polities.
- Geographical range: inner Mongolia, China
- Period: Middle Bronze Age
- Dates: 800 BCE — 160 BCE
- Preceded by: Ordos culture
- Followed by: Xiongnu

The Maoqinggou culture (Chinese: 毛庆沟文化, 800-200 BCE) is an archaeological culture of Inner Mongolia (Liangcheng County, Ulanqab, Inner Mongolia, China, 013764), to the east of the Ordos culture area, centered around the Maoqinggou cemetery. It is an important site for the understanding of China's northern grasslands in the early Iron Age. The site has four phases, from the Spring and Autumn period to the late Warring States period, including a period of early Xiongnu occupation.

The site is noted for its Scythian (Saka) style artifacts and weapons, which are of a similar type to those the Saka Chandman culture of western Mongolia, in the Animal style. The dagger especially have typical ornithomorphic styles, and are dated to the 6th century BCE. The Maoqinggou culture is sometimes considered as a "Scythian culture". This Scythian culture disappeared in the 3rd-2nd centuries BCE with the onset of the Xiongnu.

It is thought that the early people of Maoqinggou were directly related to the nomadic cultures of the Northern Zone. Their culture expanded tremendously, and in the northeast replaced earlier cultures such as the Upper Xiajiadian.

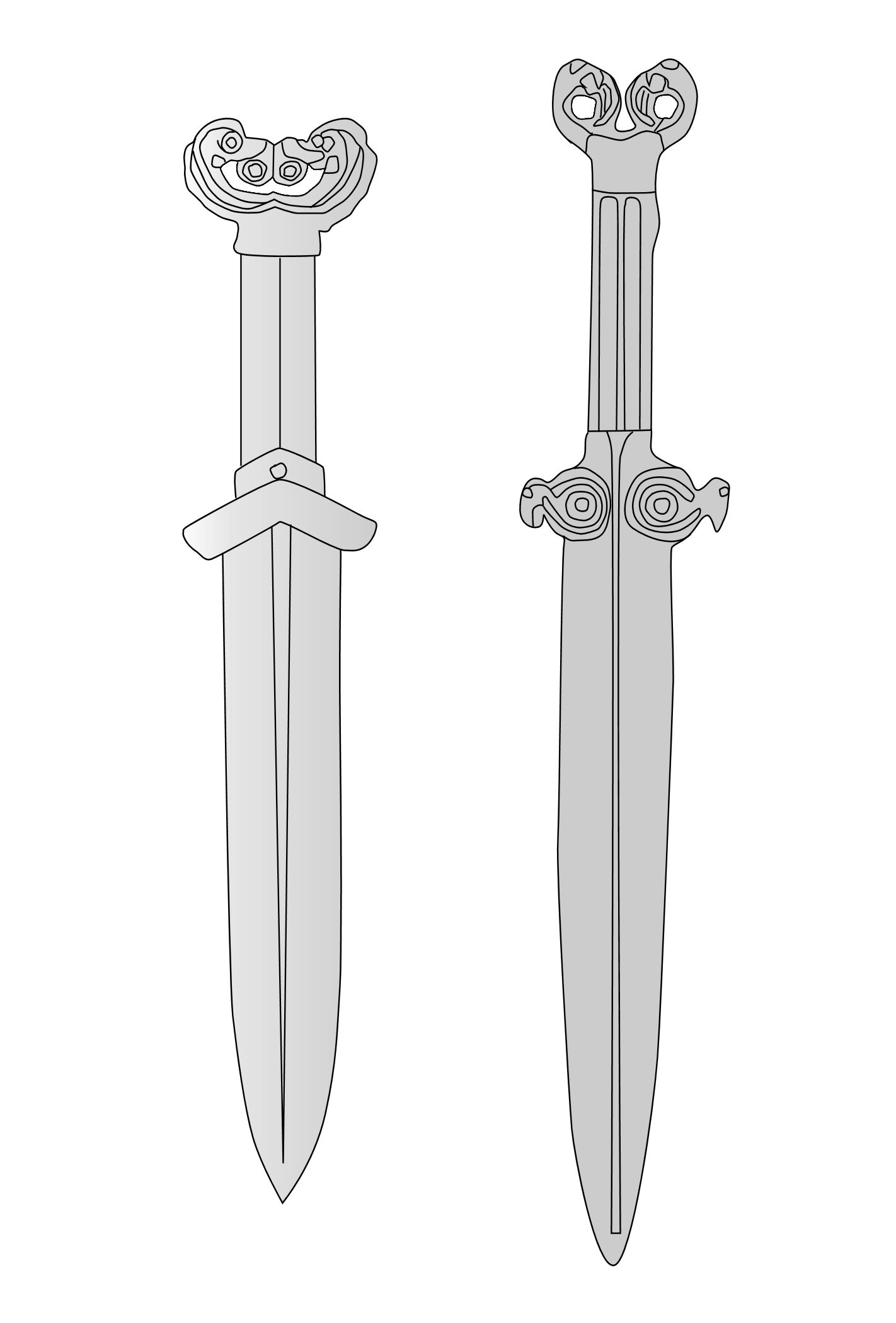
Scythian-style Maoqinggou daggers, 6th century BCE.
