= Shimao =

Neolithic site in China

- 石峁 (Chinese)
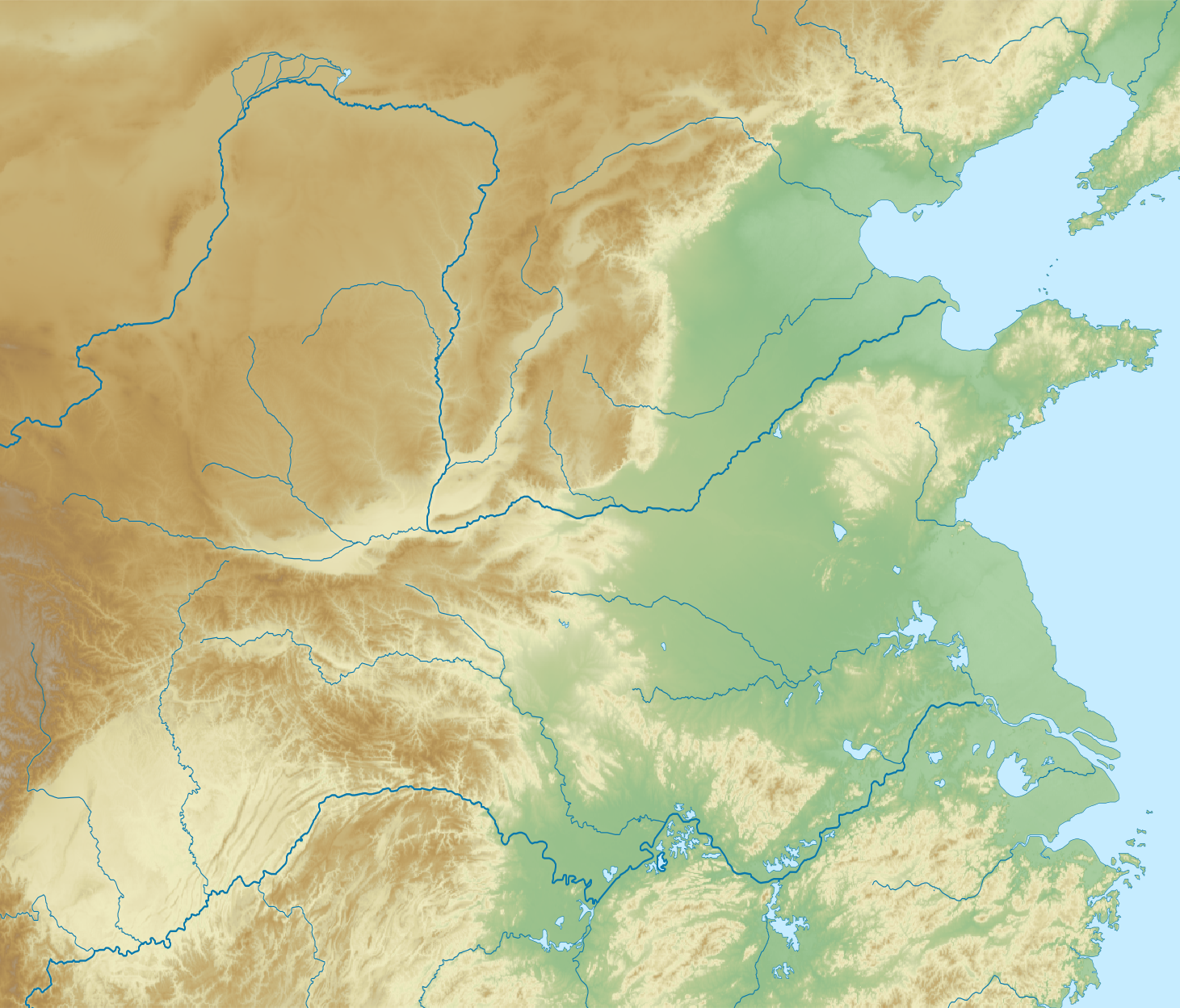
- Location in Northern China
- 38.5657°N 110.3252°E
- Type: Settlement
- Location: Shaanxi, China

History
- Built: c. 2300 BC
- Abandoned: c. 1800 BC

Site notes
- Area: 400 ha (990 acres)
- Archaeologists: Zhouyoung Sun

Shimao (Chinese: 石峁; pinyin: Shímǎo) is a Neolithic site in Shenmu County, Shaanxi, China. The site is located in the northern part of the Loess Plateau, on the southern edge of the Ordos Desert. It is dated to around 2000 BC, near the end of the Longshan period, and is the largest known walled site of that period in China, at 400 ha. It is one of the Yellow River civilizations. The fortifications of Shimao were originally believed to be a section of the Great Wall of China, but the discovery of jade pieces prompted an archaeological investigation, which revealed that the site was of Neolithic age.

The discovery of Shimao has been challenging traditional views favouring the model of the preliminary development of complex societies in the Central Plains. Instead, large and sophisticated polities such as Shimao already existed just outside the surroundings, while maintaining independence and inter-connection. Rather than being a periphery or a transfer zone between the Central Plains and the steppe, Shimao may actually have been an economic heartland and technological hub at the center of exchanges, at the origin of many Middle Yellow River traditions, leading for example to the later development of the Erlitou culture.

== Walled city ==
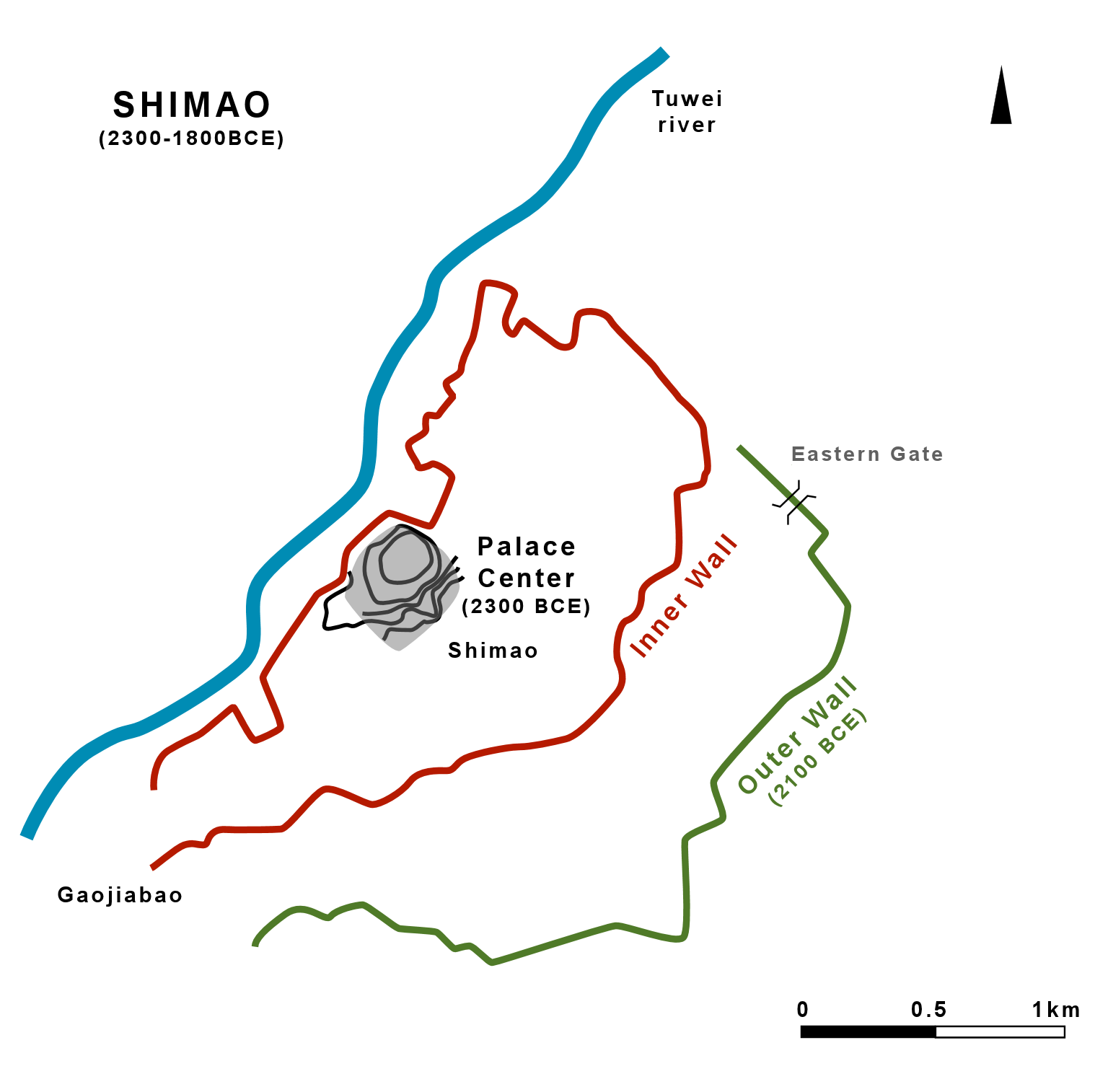
Plan of Shimao archaeological site

The city was surrounded by inner and outer stone walls, in contrast to the rammed earth walls typical of Longshan sites in the Central Plain and Shandong. The walls were 2.5 meters thick on average, with perimeters of approximately 4,200 meters and 5,700 meters respectively, and feature gates, turrets and watch towers. The earliest site, the "palace", was a large stepped pyramid based on a loess hill which had been reworked to make 11 platforms, with a height of 70 meters. Each of these was reinforced by stone buttresses. At the top of this pyramid palaces of rammed earth were built. The inner city contained a stone-walled platform, interpreted as a palatial complex, and densely packed residential zones, cemeteries and craft workshops. Unusual features include jade embedded in the city walls, possibly to provide spiritual protection, relief sculptures of serpents and monsters, and paintings of geometrical patterns on the inner walls. Around 80 skulls were found under the city gate, mainly of young girls, suggesting ritual sacrifice.

The complexity and size of Shimao's fortifications, with its stone walls, bastions and gateways, is unparalleled in contemporary China, in particular compared to the fortifications of the Central Plains which were only made of rammed earth, as in Taosi. This difference in sophistication suggests that several architectural ideas such as the wengcheng and the mamian were transferred from Shimao to the Central Plains. Shimao fortifications are actually more similar to those of West Asia at the time, suggesting contacts and exchanges with the cultures of the West.

== Arts ==
Various jade assemblages were found at Shimao, reflecting exchanges with areas south of the Ordos. Stone sculptures on the contrary tend to support a connection with the artistic traditions of the Altai to the north, as such artistic forms with similar styles were highly developed in northern cultures such as Okunev culture (c. 2400-1750 BC) of the Tuva, Minusinsk, and Altai regions.

In general, the stone figures of Shimao can be considered as the result of connections with the Eurasian steppes, as are some technologies such as bronze making and livestock. The sculpted human faces of Shimao are highly similar to those of northern cultures, such as the Okunev, Karakol, or Chemurchek culture.

Alternatively, the Shimao statues bear resemblance to the Shijiahe culture's statues, while their daily items are similar to the Qijia culture's. This indicate the existence of a cultural community in the western inland during the Neolithic period, which was different from the Steppe culture.

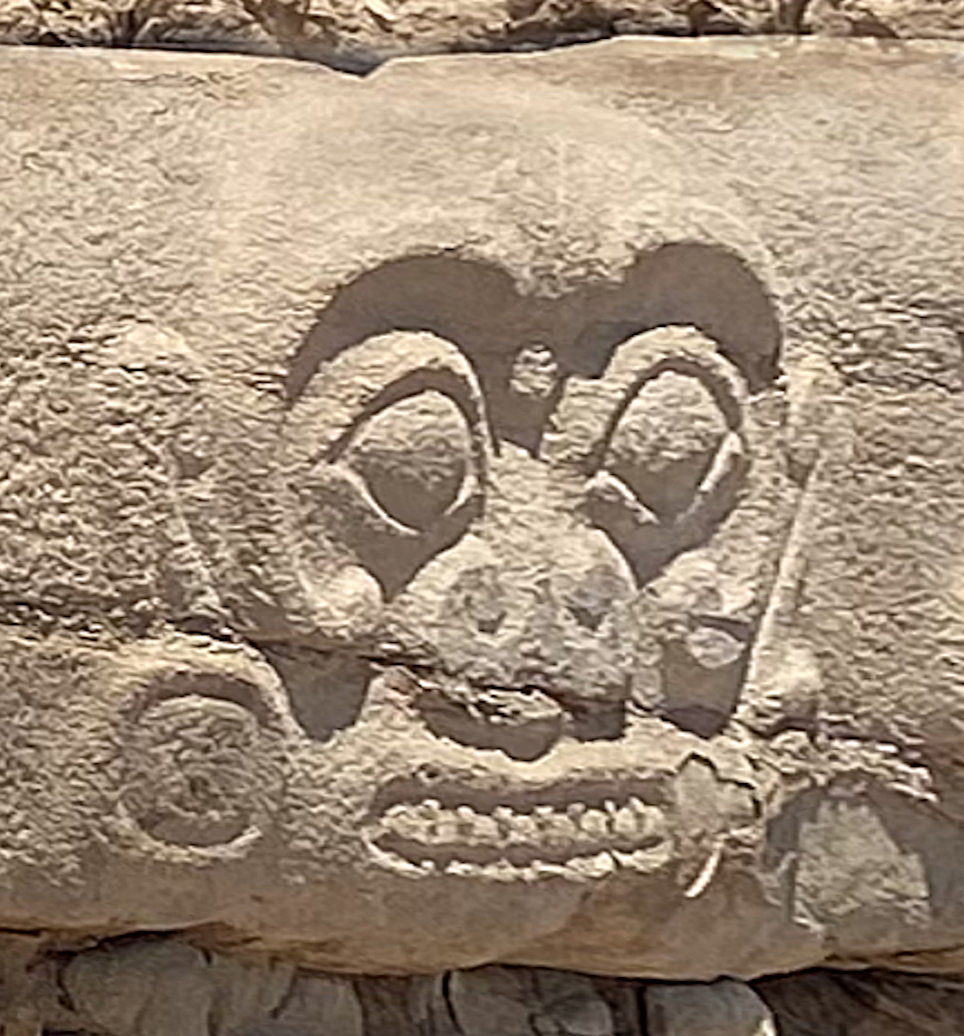
Face at the Shimao Neolithic Site, c. 2300 BC

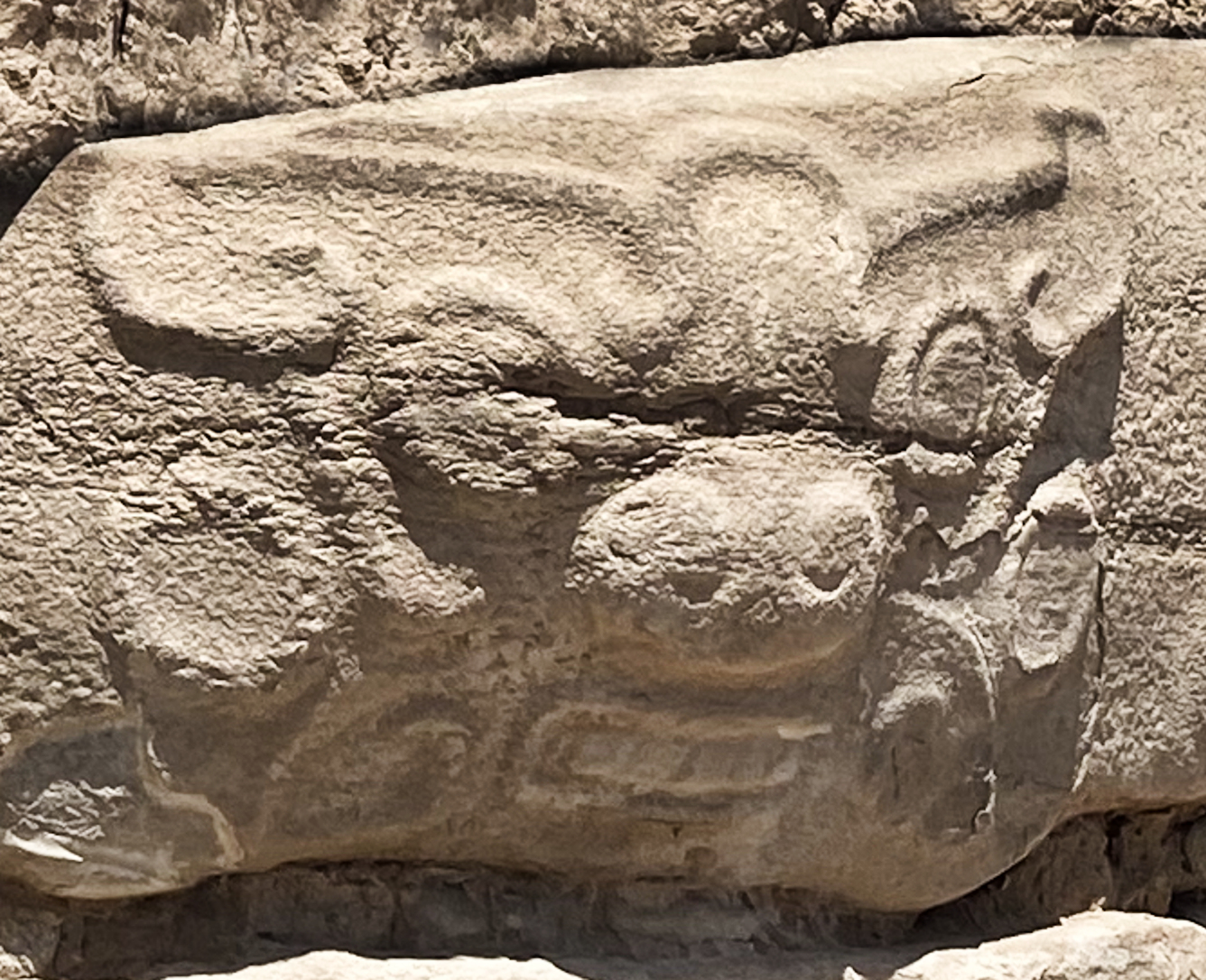
Face at the Shimao Neolithic Site, c. 2300 BC

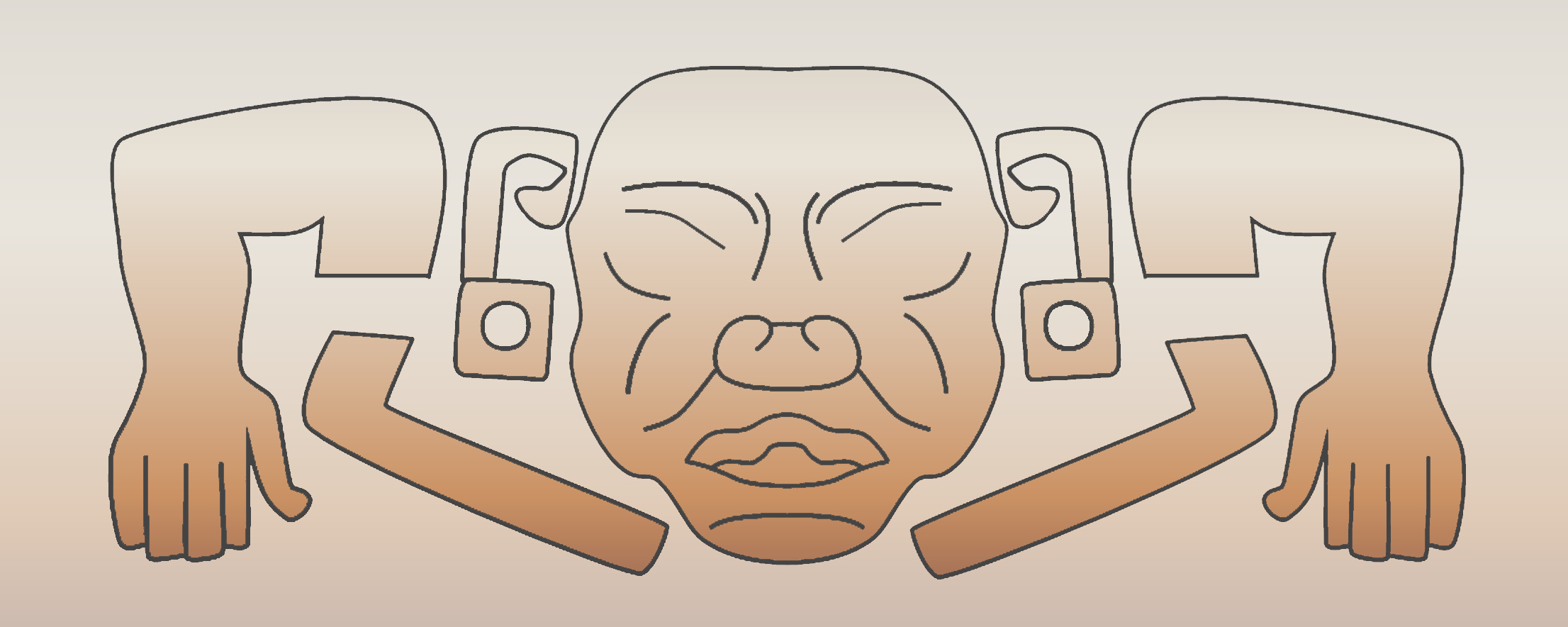
Shimao humanoid sculpture, c. 2300 BC

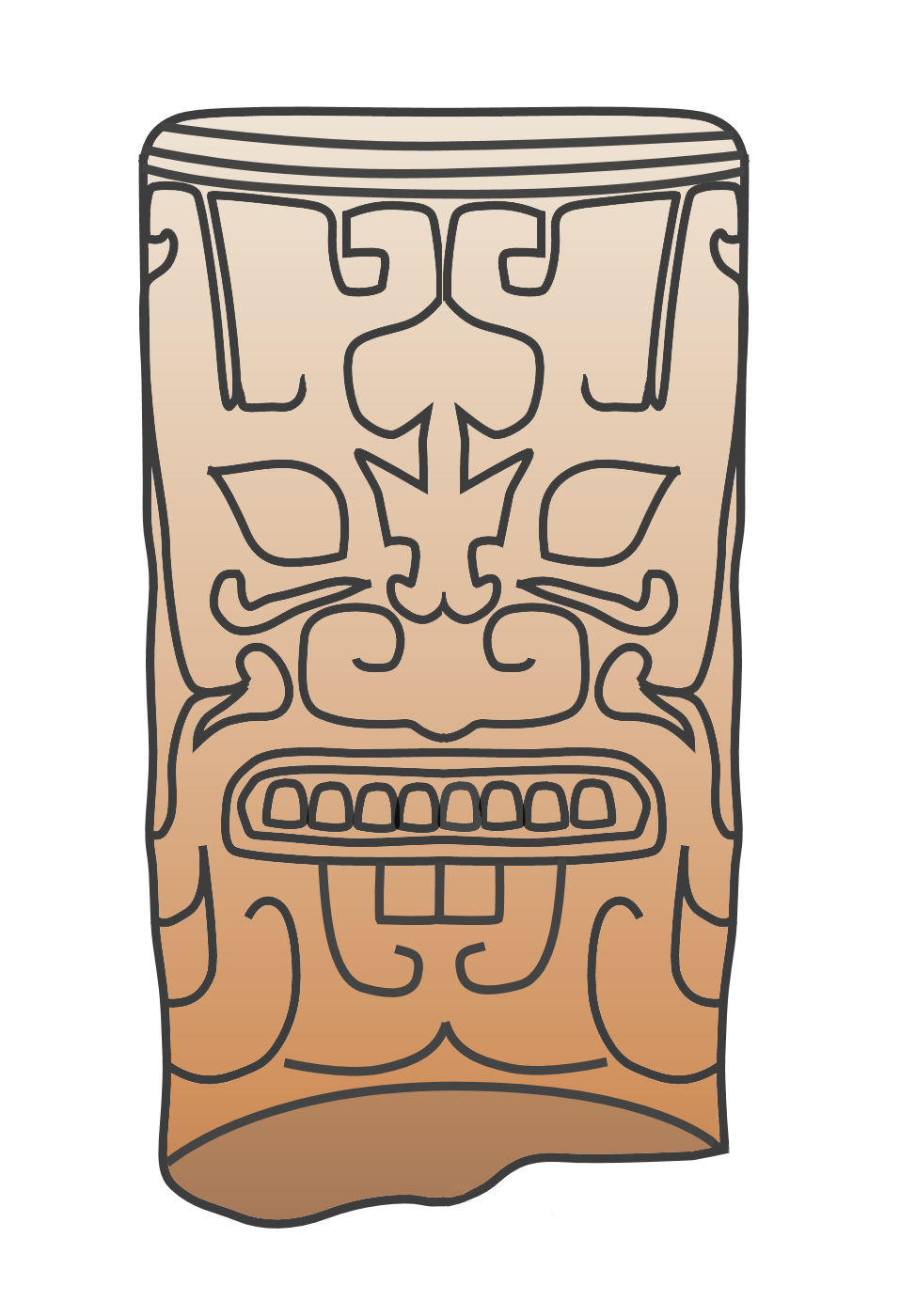
Column statue at the Shimao Neolithic Site, c. 2300-1800 BC

== Techniques ==
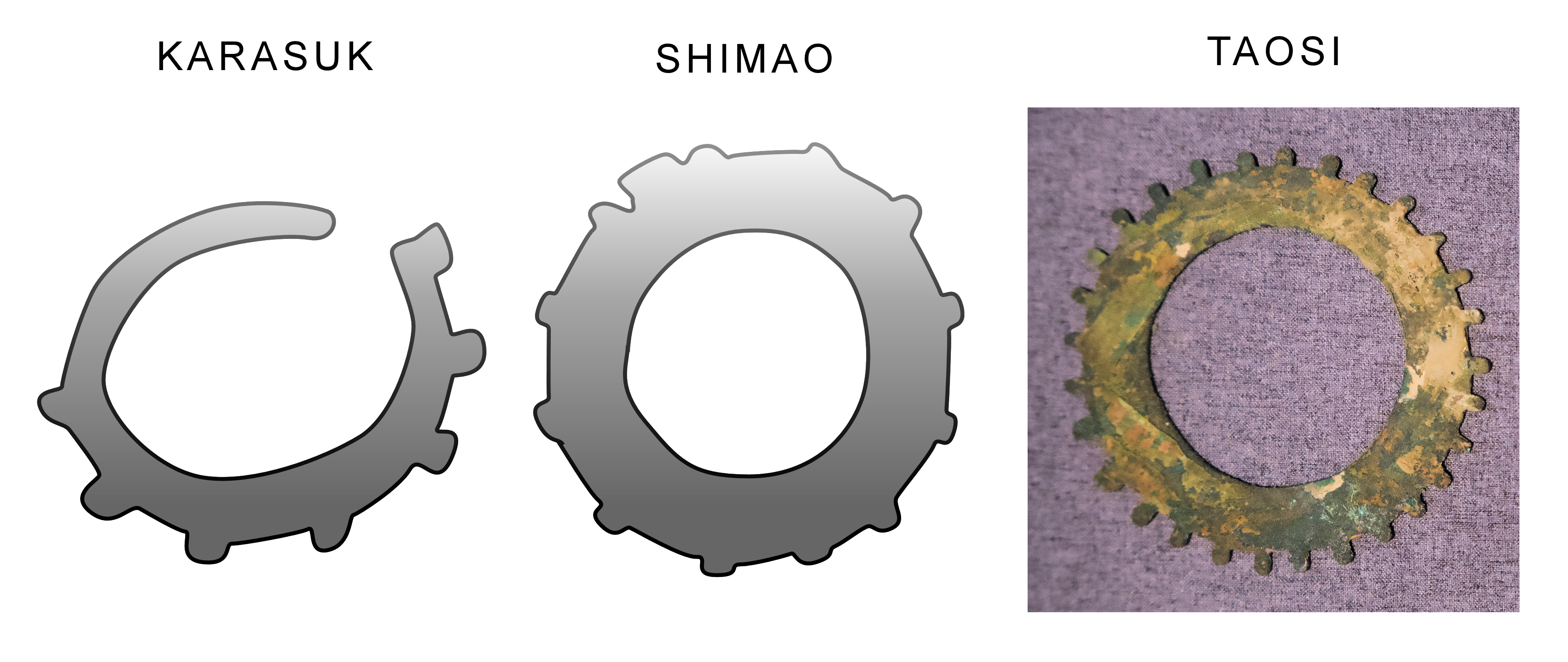
Similar bronze ornamental wheel bracelets (Karasuk, Shimao, Taosi).

Developments such as bronze working, wheat, barley, sheep, goats and cattle seem to appear here earlier than elsewhere in China, showing that its inhabitants were communicating with Eurasian Steppe peoples across extensive trade networks. Additionally, materials likely from Southern China, such as alligator skin drums, have been found, indicating a north–south commerce across what is now modern China. Thin curved bones discovered at Shimao are believed to be the earliest known evidence of the jaw harp, an instrument that has spread to over 100 different ethnic groups, suggesting possible Chinese origins.

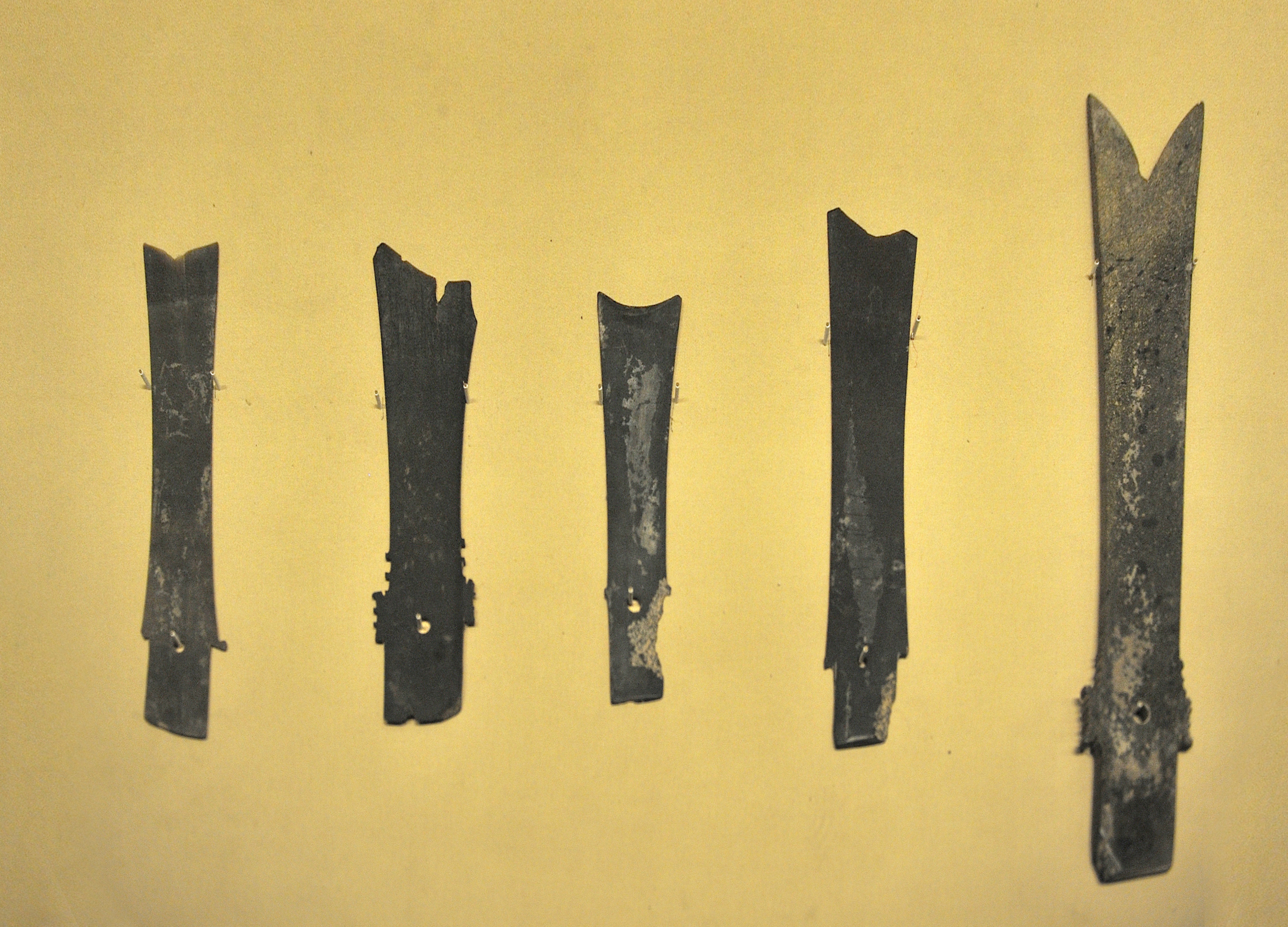
Zhang scepters (牙璋, Yazhang "toothed scepter") from Shimao

The techniques employed by the people at Shimao were multi-faceted: besides large-scale stone fortification, numerous tools and utensils have been found, such as bronze knives, arrowheads, and ornaments similar to those of the northern steppes, as well as jade and Longshan-type pottery which tend to be connected to the Chinese Neolithic in the Central Plains.

Some of the artifacts and designs known from the Bronze Age civilisation of the Central Plains are thought to have been originally created in the northern regions, such as the zhang jade sceptre, a Chinese symbol of political and religious power, which seems to have been created first at Shimao, before spreading to the rest of China, and as far south as Vietnam.

The prevailing hypothesis concerning the abandonment of Shimao is tied to a rapid shift to a cooler, drier climate on the Loess Plateau, from around 2000 to 1700 BC. This environmental change likely led populations to shift to the Central Plain, leaving the site to be forgotten until the 21st century.

== Genetics ==
Shimao and contemporary cultures c. 2000 BCE

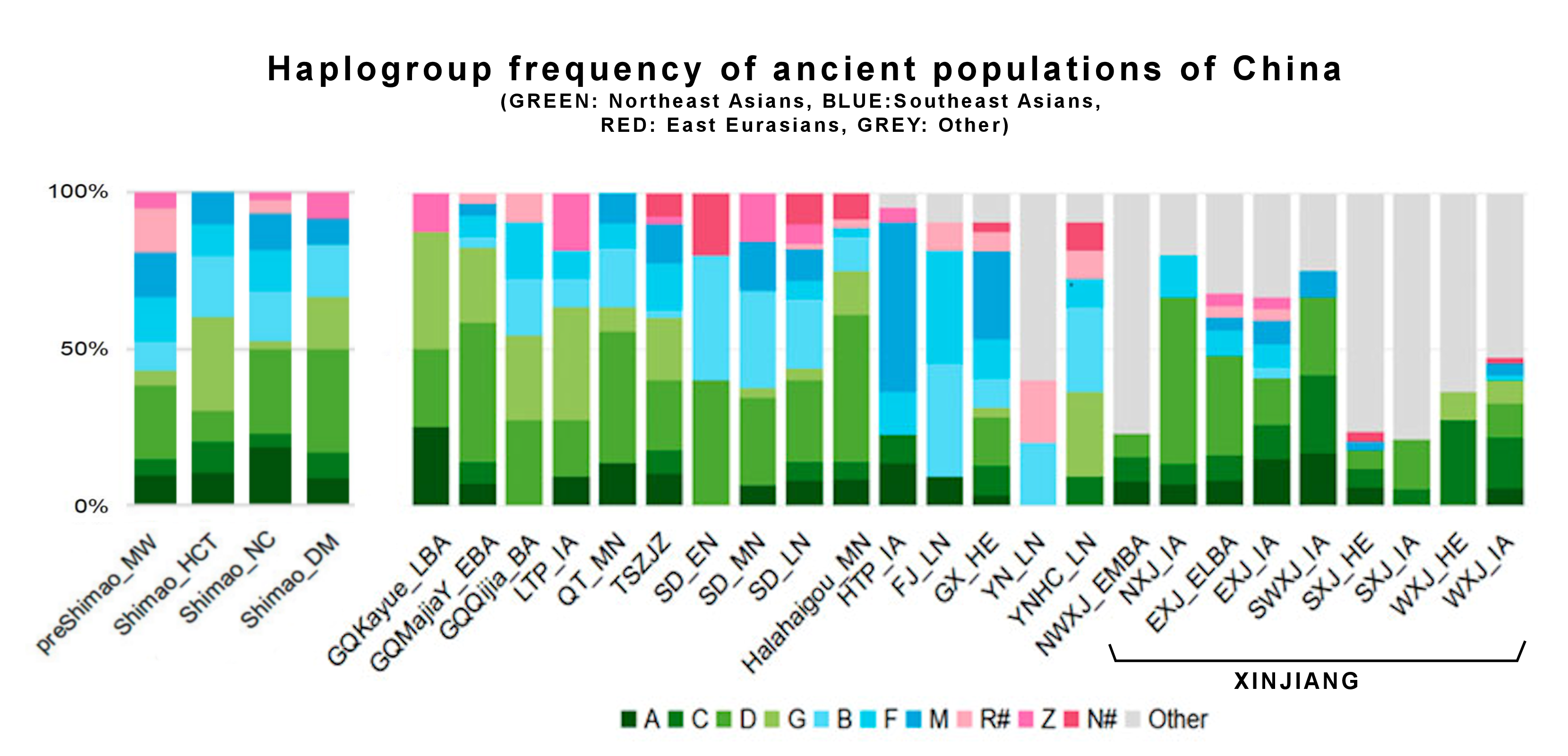
Haplogroup frequency of ancient populations of China, including Shimao and Xinjiang

The populations inhabiting the Shimao site had close genetic connections with earlier populations from the Middle Neolithic Yangshao culture of northern Shaanxi province, indicating a largely local origin for the society. In addition, the Shimao populations had the closest maternal affinity with the contemporaneous Taosi populations from the Longshan culture among the populations in the Yellow River basin. The Shimao populations also shared more affinity with present-day northern Han Chinese than with the southern Han and ethnic minorities (such as Daur, Mongols, Dai, Miao, etc.) of China.

According to the latest tests, the Shimao people mainly belong to Y haplogroup O-M117, which originated from the Yangshao and Qijia cultures.. Shimao people practiced both patrilineality and patrilocality and thus were likely patriarchal like Han Chinese in the historical record.
