= Shanma culture =

Bronze Age culture in Gansu, China, c. 900–200 BCE

- Shanma culture and contemporary cultures and polities in Continental Asia
- Geographical range: Gansu, China
- Dates: 1000-200 BCE
- Major sites: Gudongtan, Zhaojiashuimo
- Preceded by: Majiayao culture (2,300–2,000 BCE) Qijia culture (2,200–1,600 BCE); Xichengyi culture (2,000–1,600 BCE) Siba culture (1,600–1,300 BCE)
- Followed by: Shajing culture (800–200 BCE); Han dynasty (202 BCE–220 CE)

The Shanma culture (Ch: 骟马文化) was an ancient culture in the Hexi Corridor from 1000 to 200 BCE. It succeeded the Siba culture (1,600–1,300 BCE) in the area, and preceded the Shajing culture (800–200 BCE), and the expansion of the Han dynasty (202 BCE–220 CE) in the region.

The area of the Shanma culture is broadly identical with that of the preceding Siba culture. It corresponds to the western area of the Hexi Corridor and Inner Mongolia, from Yangguan in the west to Yumen in the east, with the Shajing culture not far beyond to the southeast.

The Shanma culture is known to have used jade, from the Hanxia deposit, and later from the Mazongshan deposit, or from the Jingbaoer jade mine in the Mazong Mountain (Mazong Shan).

The Shanmas had agricultural activities and grew barley, wheat, and millets. But their livestock indicate a tendency towards nomadic pastoralism, as they had animals better suited for long-distance travel such as dogs, ovicaprids, horses, cattle, and camels, but they had no pigs.

The Shanma culture may have been associated with the Wusun tribes of Chinese history.

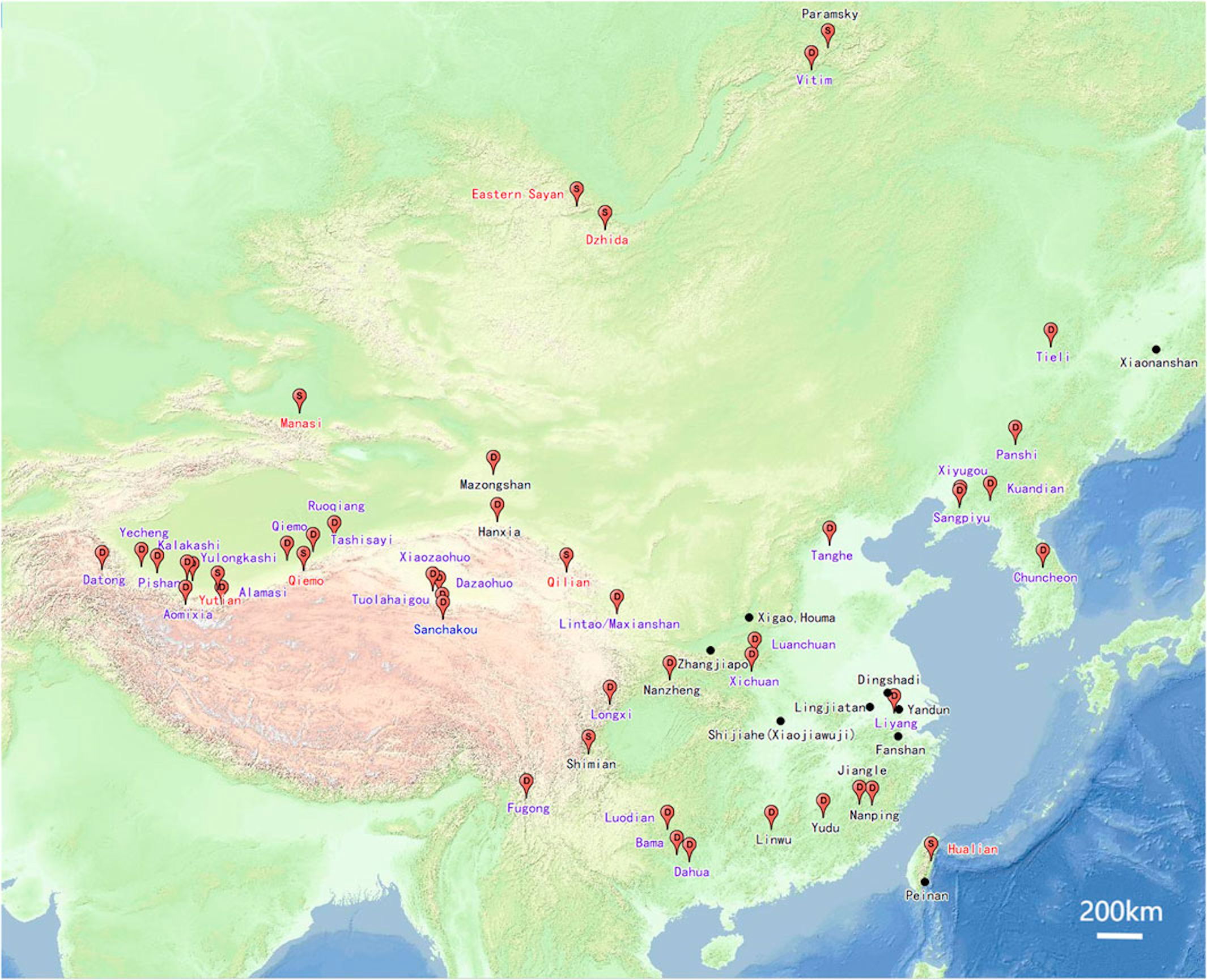
Distribution of reported nephrite deposits and the sites where jadewares were excavated in Northeast Asia

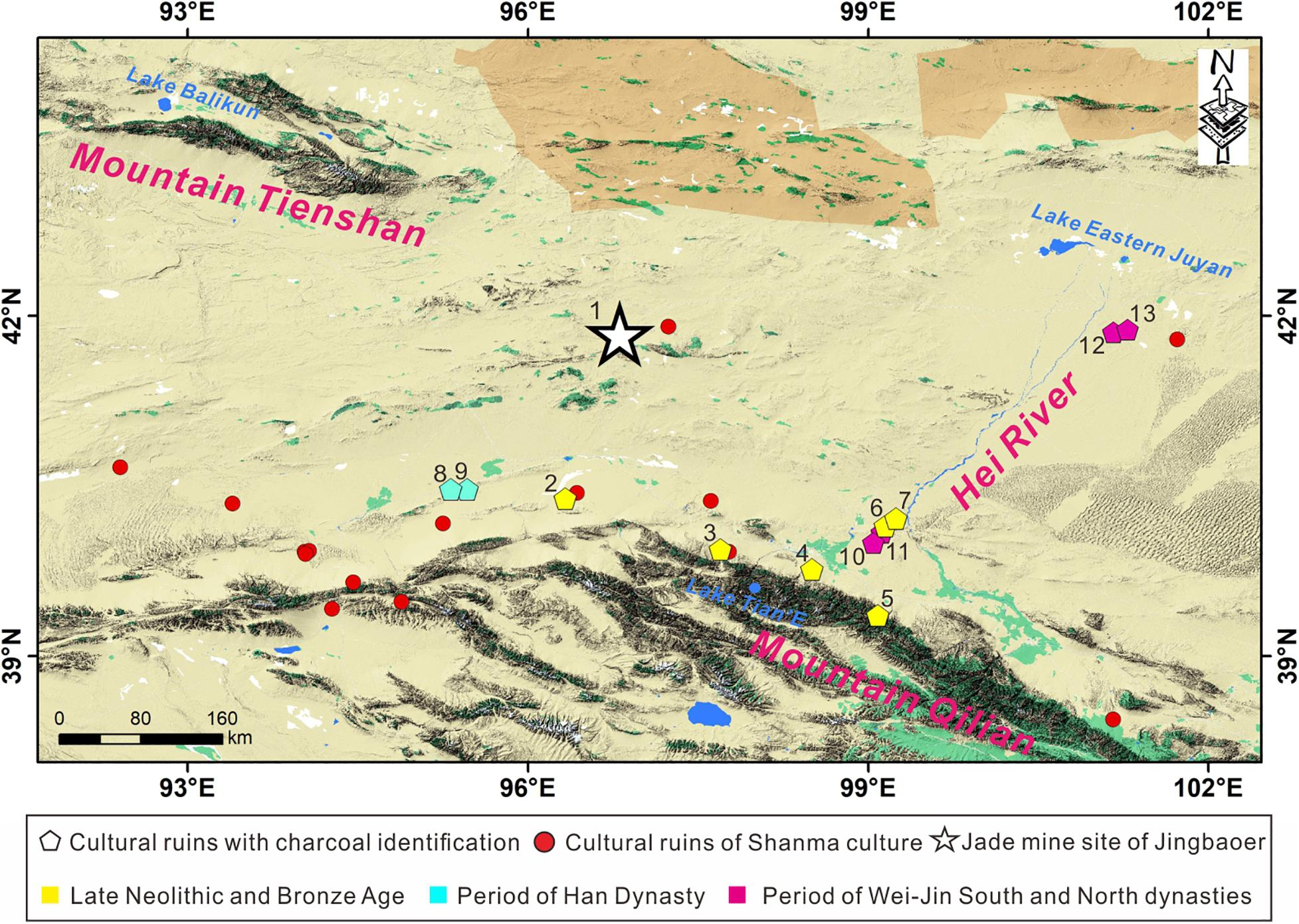
Shanma culture localities in the western Hexi Corridor

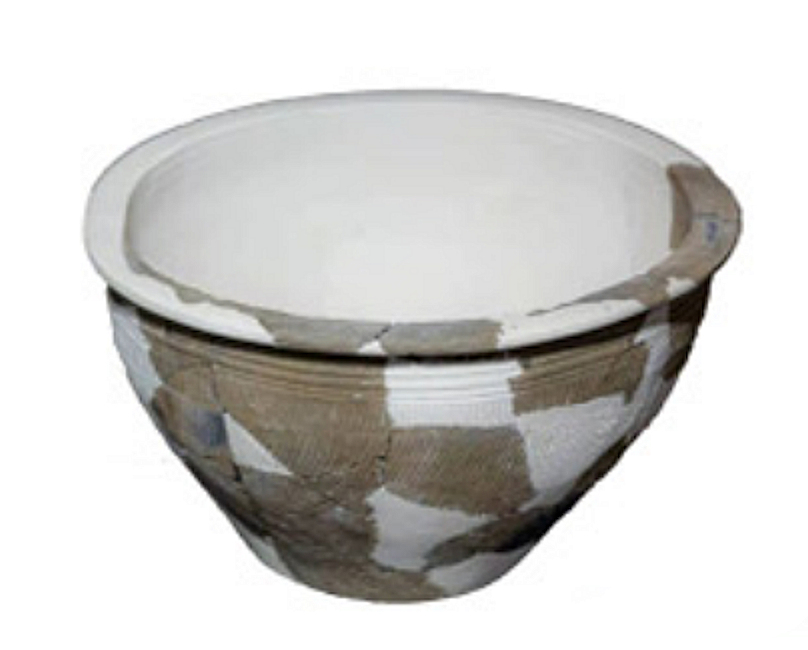
Shanma ceramic vessel, Jingbaoer mine

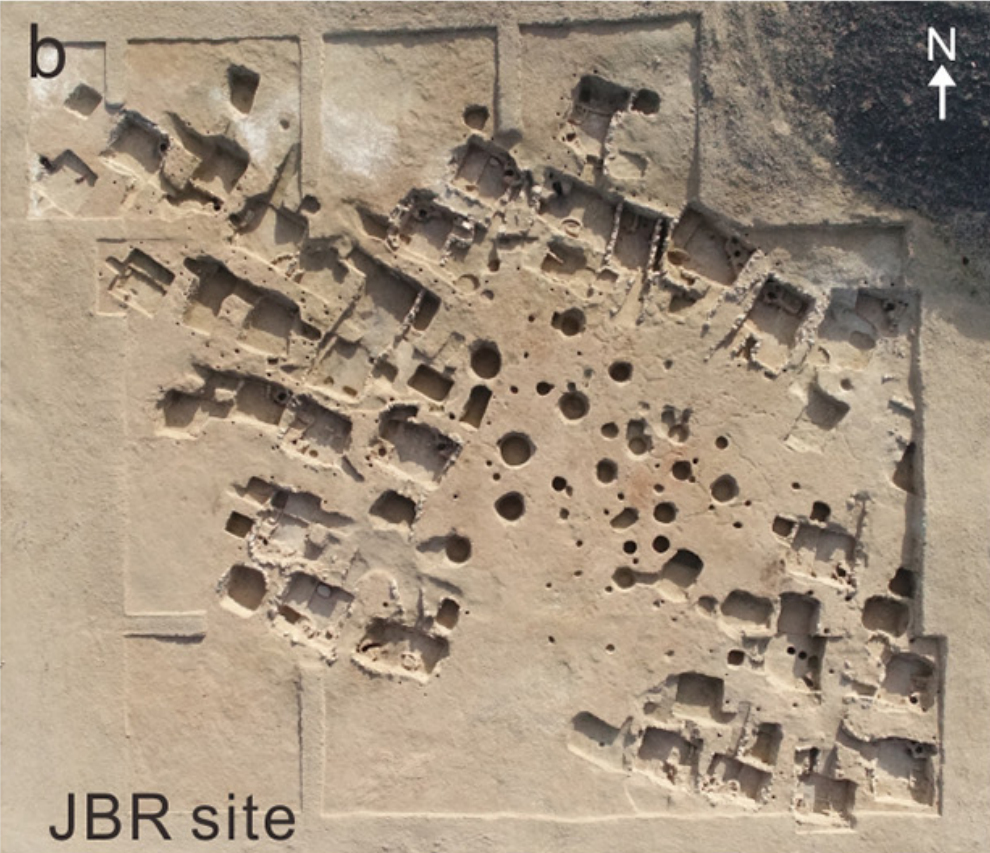
Jingbaoer jade mine in the Mazong Mountain (Mazong Shan)

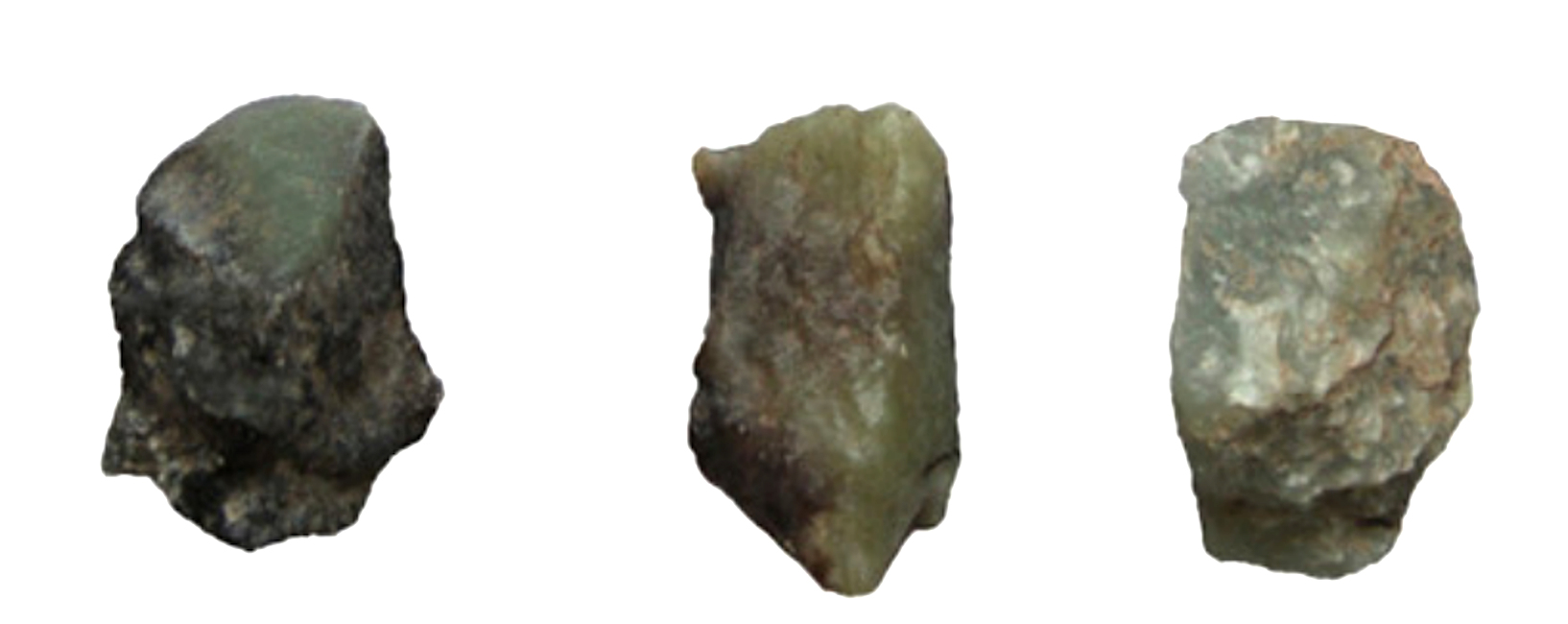
Jade ore from the Jingbaoer mine
