= Shajing culture =

Ancient Iron Age culture in Gansu, China

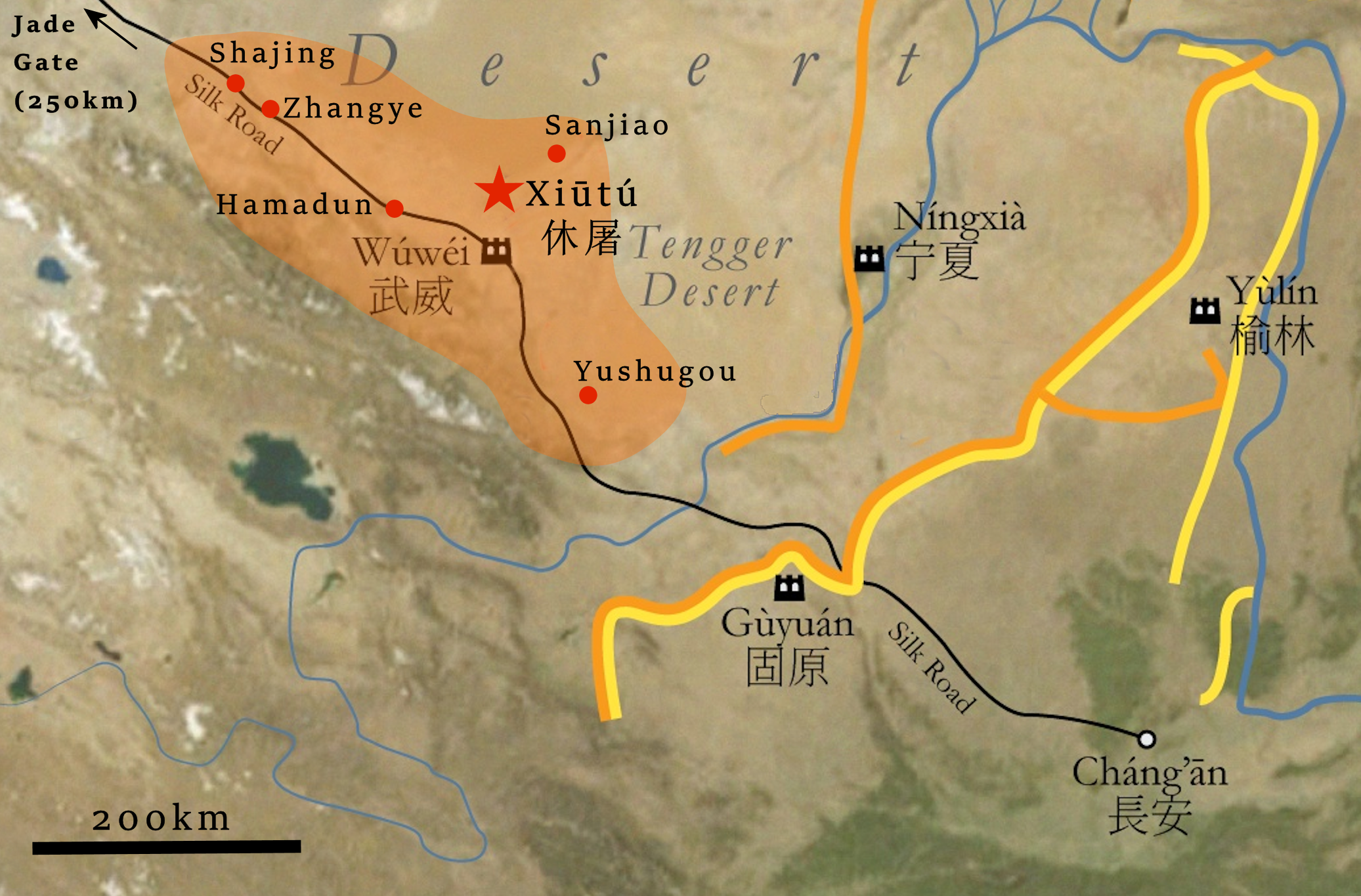
- Location of the Shajing culture, with contemporary cultures circa 500 BCE Map of the Shajing culture ( ). The City of Xiutu was about 20km north of Wuwei, and about 500km from Guyuan and its Great Wall built by King Zhao of Qin in 271 BCE, and by Qin Shihuang (circa 210 BCE,)
- Geographical range: Gansu
- Dates: 800/700–100 BCE.
- Type site: Shajing 沙井村 (Minqin County) 39.095264°N 100.266670°E
- Major sites: Liuhudong (Minqin County) Hamadun (Yongchang County); Yushugou (Yongdeng County); Sanjiaocheng 三角城 (Jinchang) Liangucheng 连古城; Yangchaodun 柳湖墩 Jinshangsanjiaocheng 金昌三角城
- Preceded by: Machang culture (2200-2000 BCE) Xichengyi culture (2000-1600 BCE); Siba culture (1700-1300 BCE); Siwa culture (1350-650 BCE) Shanma culture (900-100 BCE)
- Followed by: Xiongnu (King Xiutu, 150-121 BCE) Western Han dynasty (121 BCE-) Majiayuan culture (3rd-2nd c. BCE)

The Shajing culture (Ch: 沙井文化, 800/700–100 BCE), is an ancient Iron Age culture in the area of Gansu, to the northwest of the Central Plains of China. The village of Shajing is about 250 km northwest of Wuwei, while the village of Yushugou, another important Shajing site, is about 140 km to its southeast. The Shajing culture is closely associated to the Saka culture of the Xinjiang, the Ordos culture of Inner Mongolia and the Upper Xiajiadian culture of Liaoning. It was a culture essentially based on pastoral nomadism. As of 2017, seven sites had been excavated and almost as many fortified settlements built with walls of compacted loess.

== Characteritics ==
The ecological context of the Shajing culture was one of general aridification, following the warm and humid climatic conditions from the Late Glacial to the Middle Holocene from which the Majiayao culture and the Qijia culture had benefited. Usually, such arid conditions lead to material and cultural decline, but the Shajing Culture was able to flourish along the lower Shiyang River as the Zhuye Lake was retreating, and the Xiongnu were able to establish the city of Xiutu along the Hongshui River, leading to a flourishing of nomadic culture within a context of drought. Archaeological remains suggest that the people of the Shajing culture engaged in pastoralism but also in extensive agricultural production.

The bronze objects of this culture follow the Animal style of the northern steppes, with motifs of eagle, deer or dog. Remains of chariots have been found, as well as iron spades. Archaeological finds of iron knives and spades suggest that the Shajing culture may have been instrumental in the transmission of iron technology to China.

Overall, Scythian-like artifacts form the core of this culture, but the ethnic affiliation of the Shajing people remains uncertain: they could have been Yuezhi, proto-Tibetean Qiang or Rong, or even Iranian Wusun, or a composition of these ethnic and cultural elements. The Shajing culture may well have belonged to the Yuezhi, although the zone between the Tian Shan and Dunhuang is now sometimes thought to be a better candidate.

The Shajing culture had walled settlements, probably for defensive purposes, inside which portable yurts were set up. The Sanjiaocheng walled settlement (三角城 38.99°N 103.32°E) in Jinchang belongs to the Shajing culture as confirmed by its ceramic types, and was constructed circa 800 BCE (in the period 855–797 cal BCE), making it the oldest known walled settlement in the Hexi Corridor. It may have been one of the bases from which nomadic culture diffused into China 600–400 BCE. The site was still inhabited in the period 384–116 cal BCE, until the Chinese conquest by Huo Qubing.

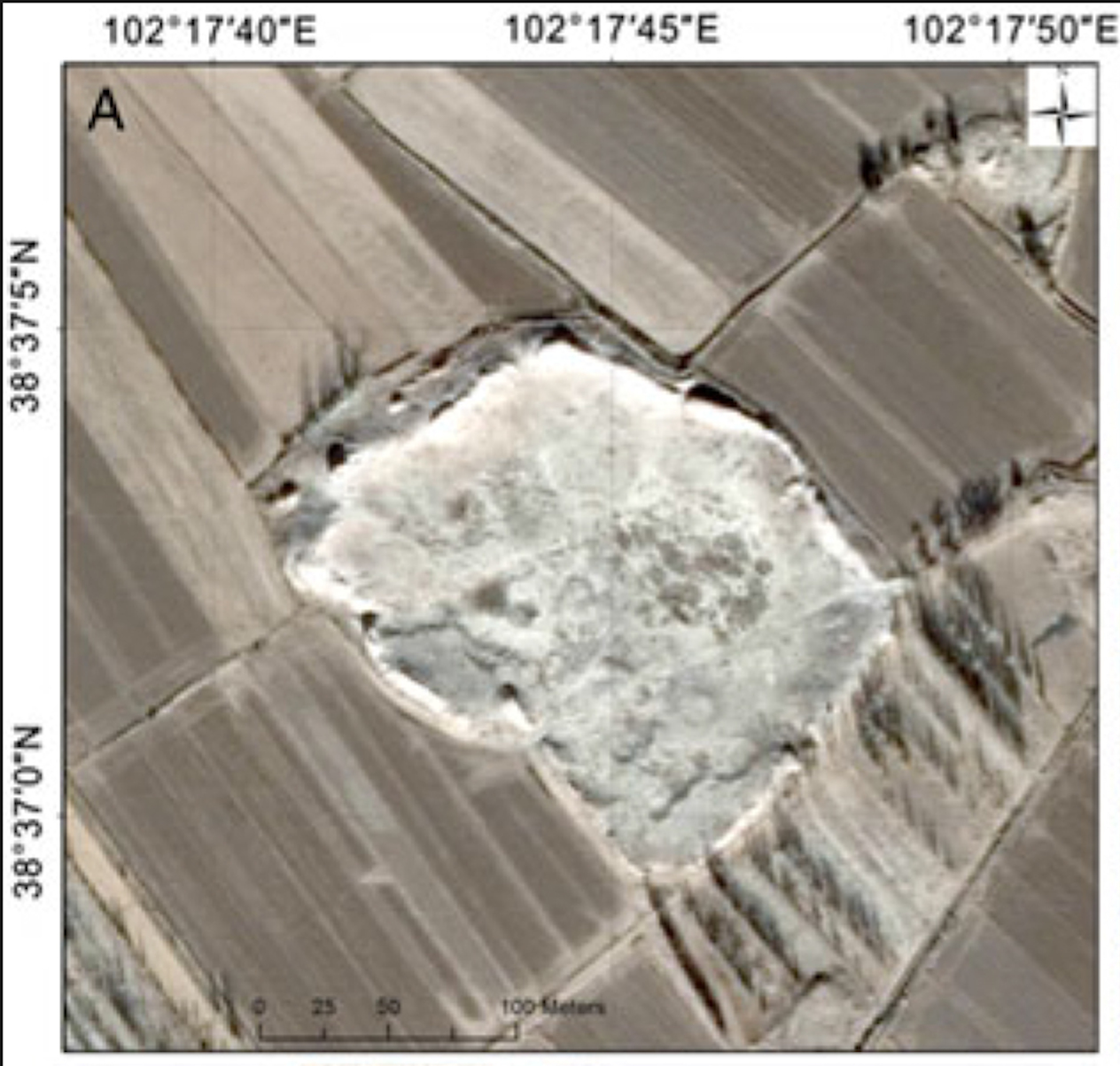
Fortifications of Sanjiaocheng (top view), built c.800 BCE, Shajing culture.

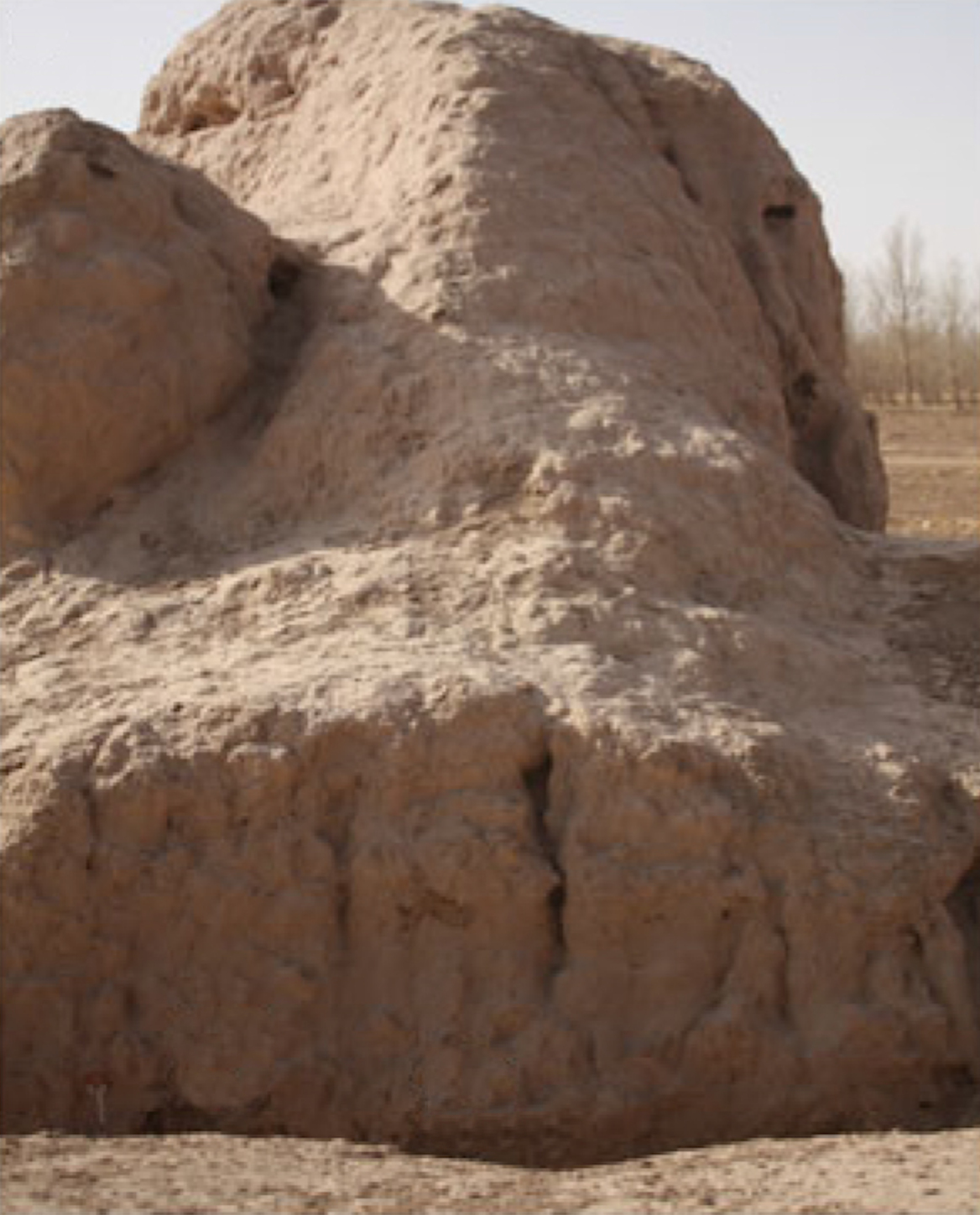
Sanjiaocheng wall remains, built c.800 BCE, Shajing culture.

=== Artifacts ===
The bronze objects of the Shajing culture follow the Animal style of the northern steppes, with motifs of eagle, deer or dog. Remains of chariots have been found, as well as iron spades.

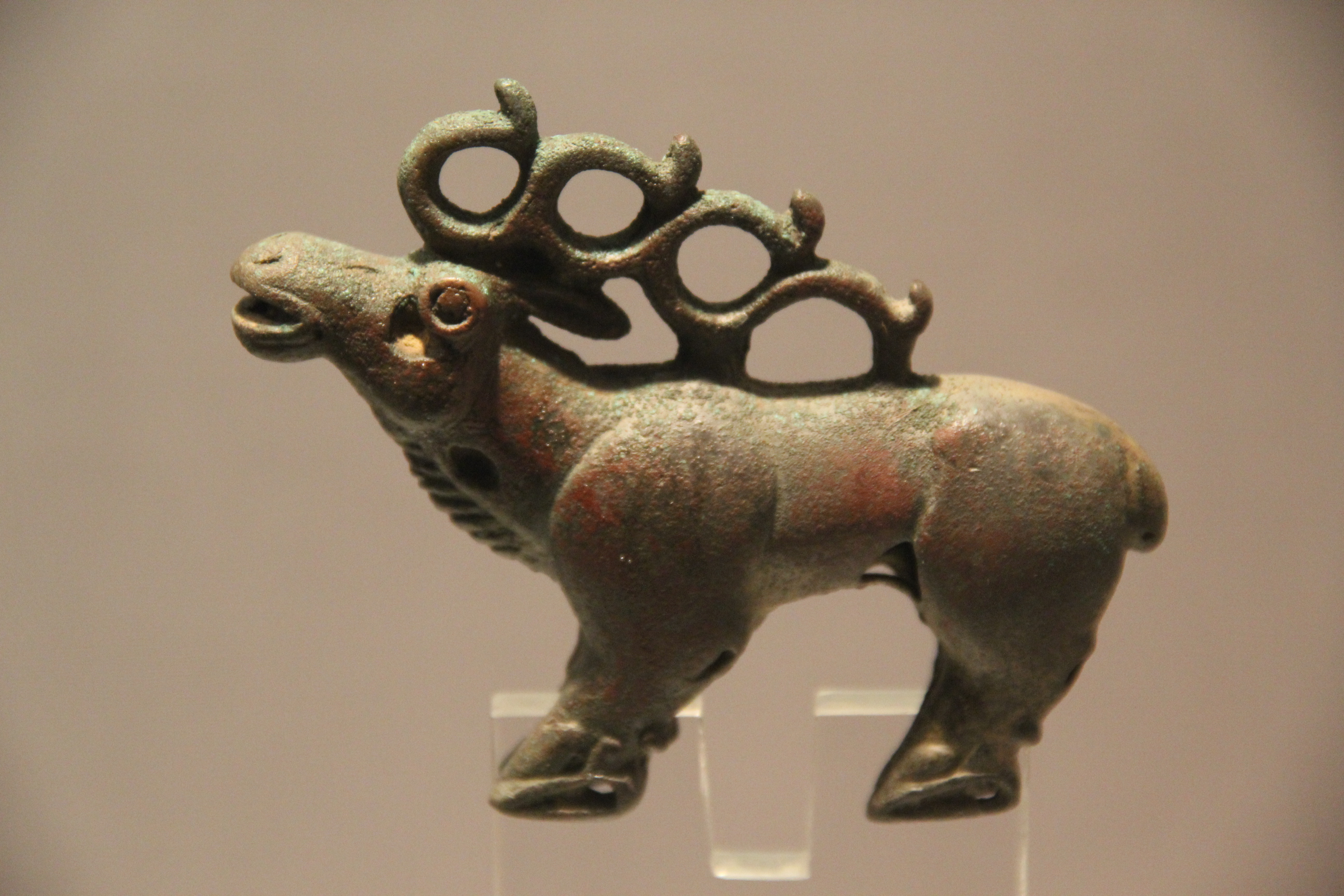
An elk from Longqu (龙渠乡), Zhangye, 475–221 BCE. Shajing culture.

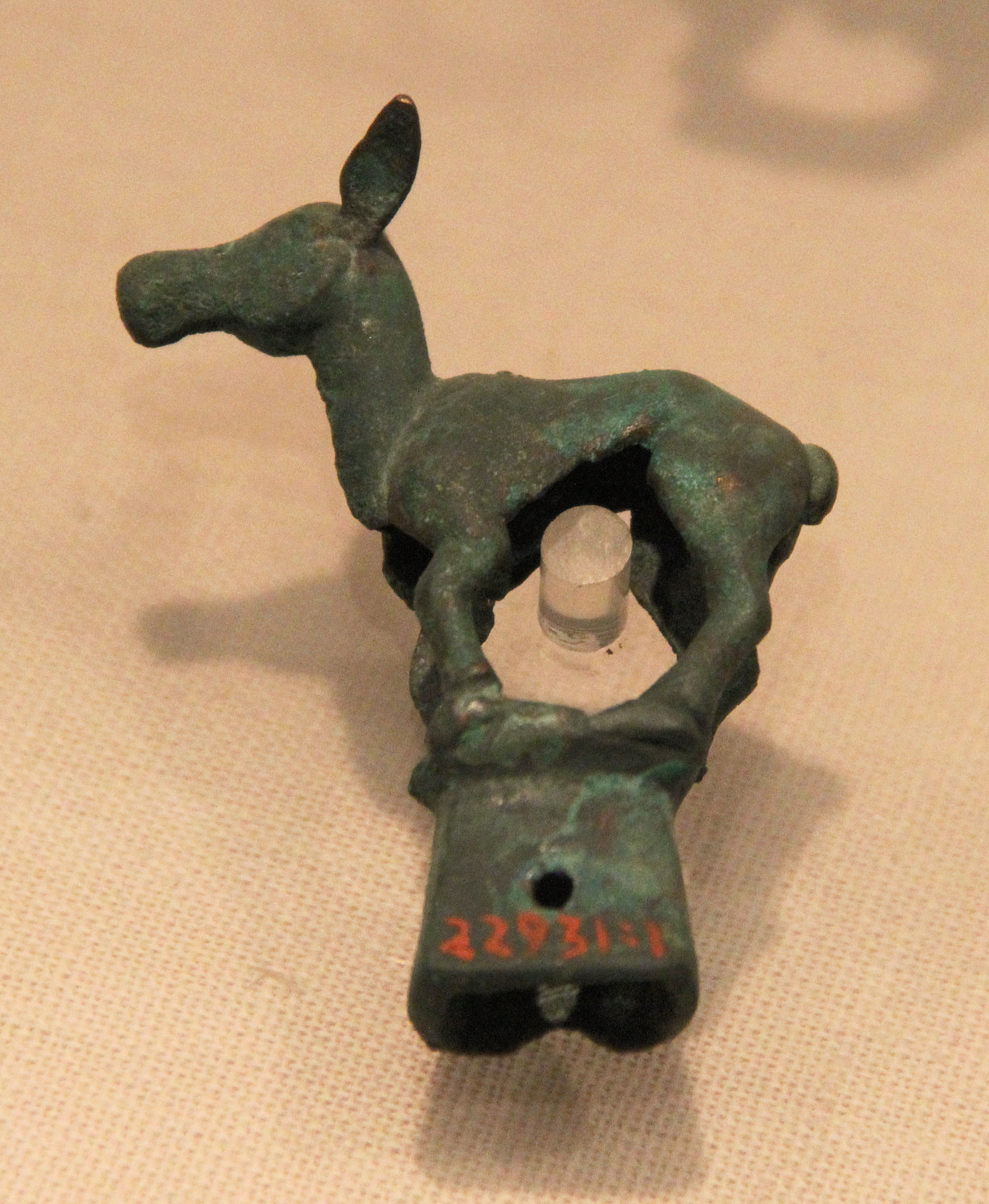
Shajing Culture Bronze Deer Ornament

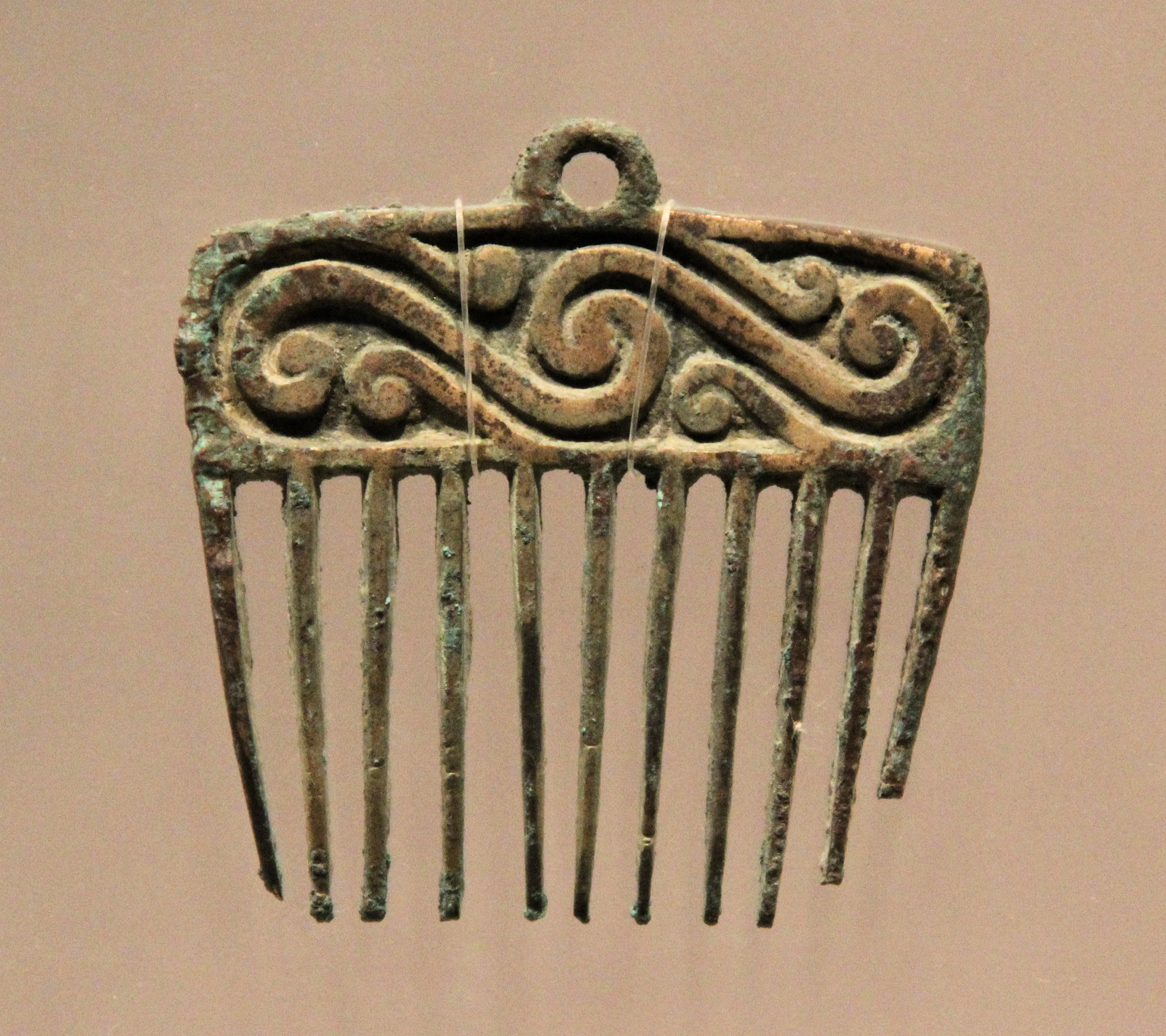
Shajing Culture Bronze Comb

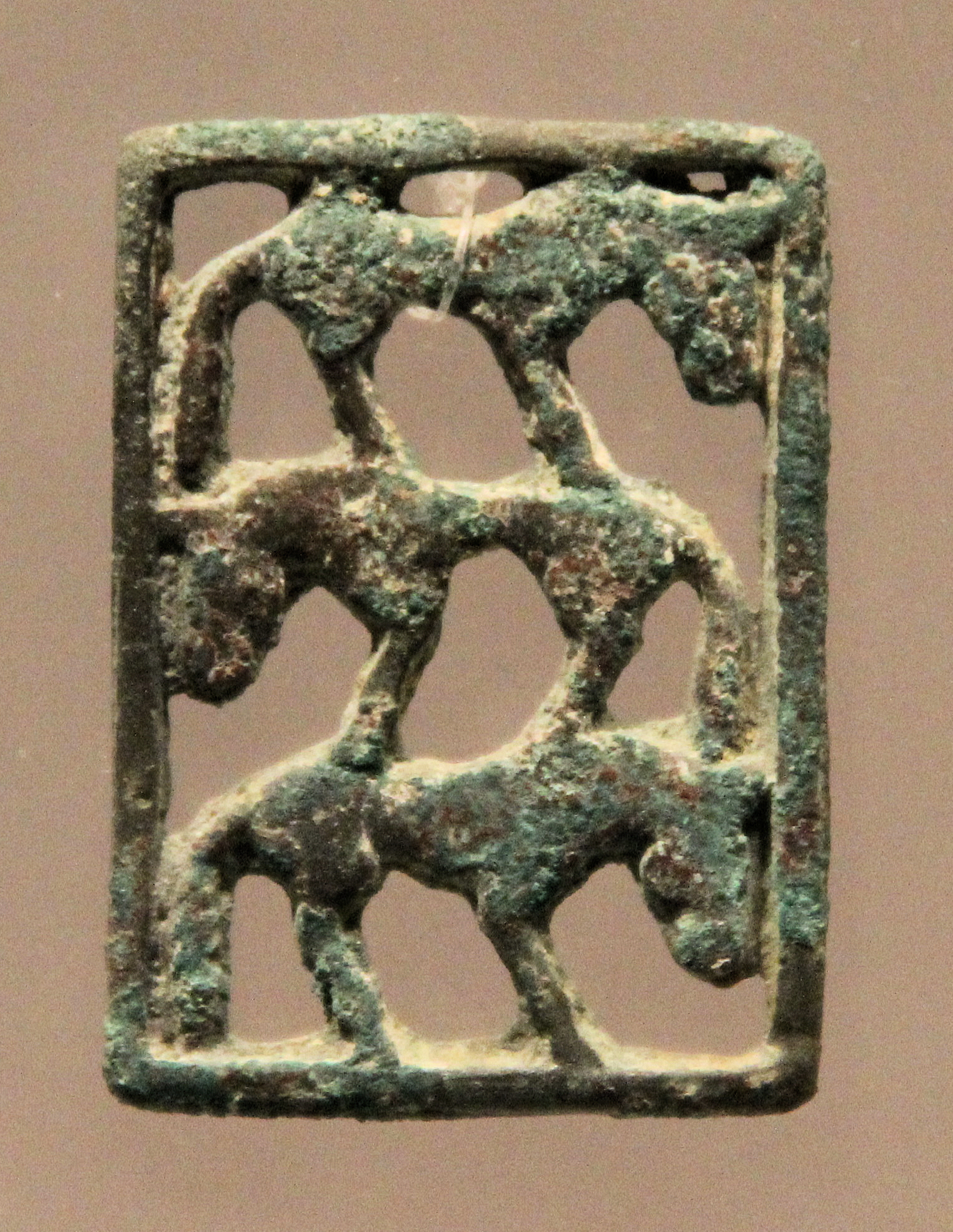
Shajing Culture Bronze Ornament

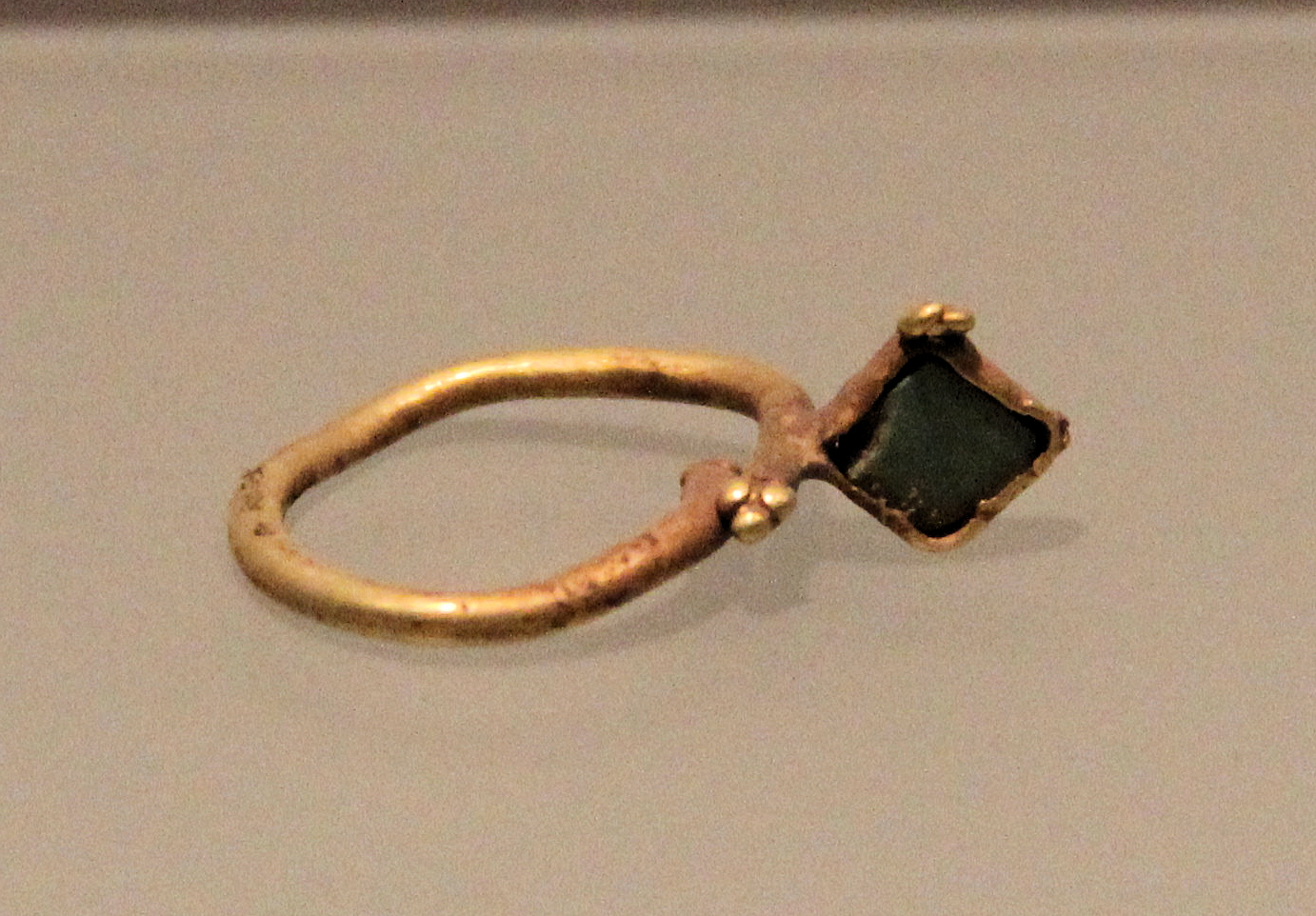
Shajing Culture Turquoise Inlaid Gold Ring

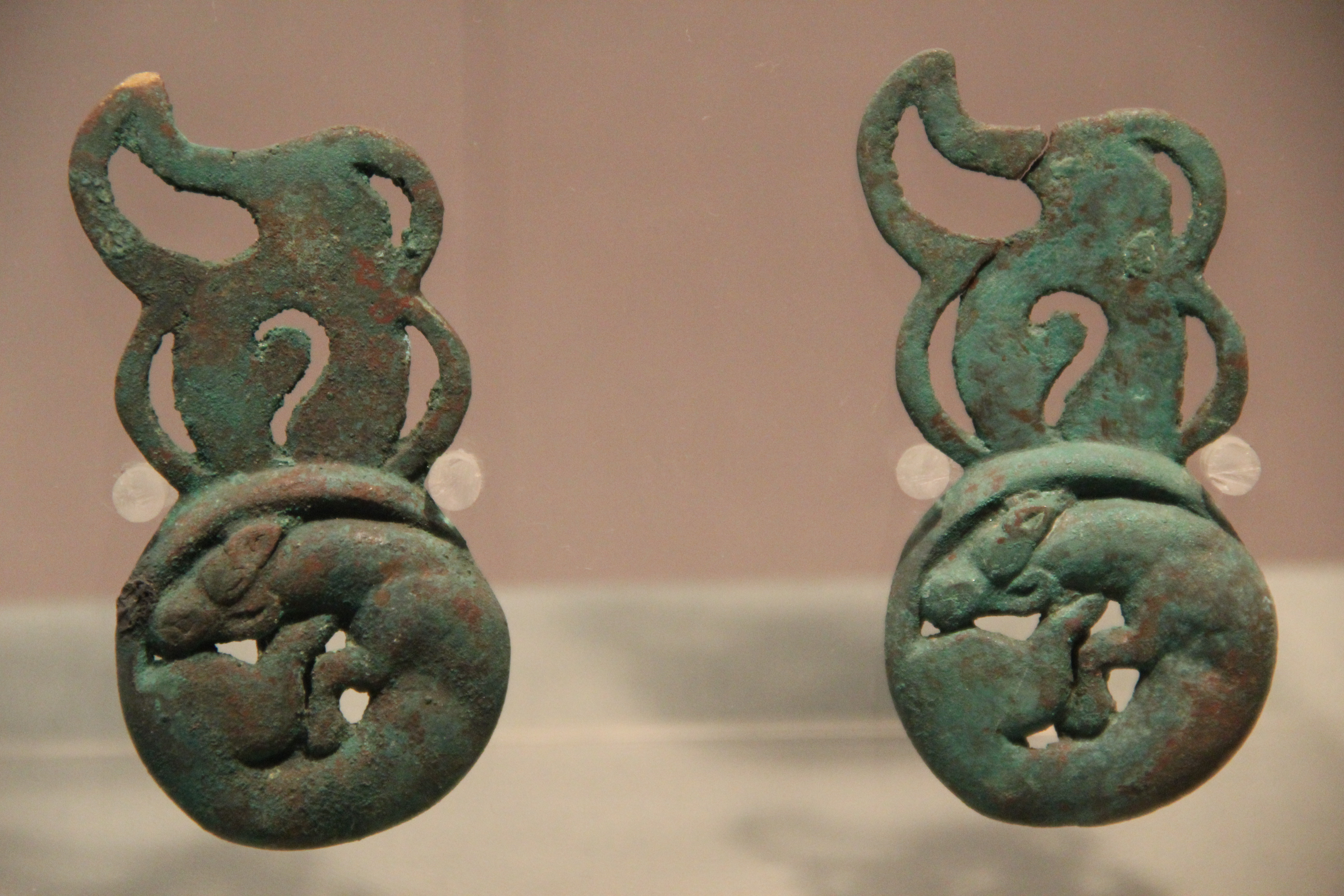
Shajing Culture Bronze Ornamental Plates

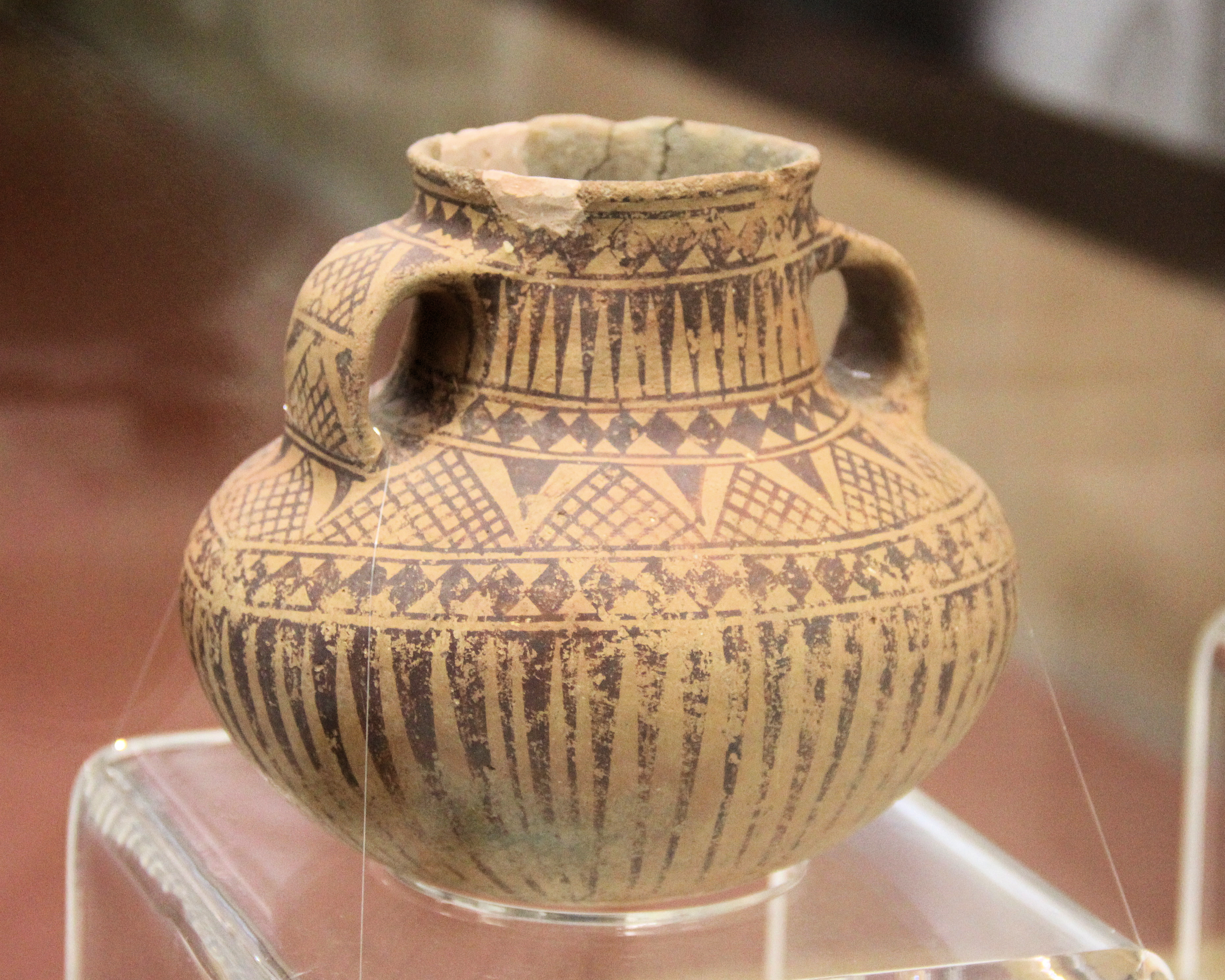
Shajing Culture Pottery

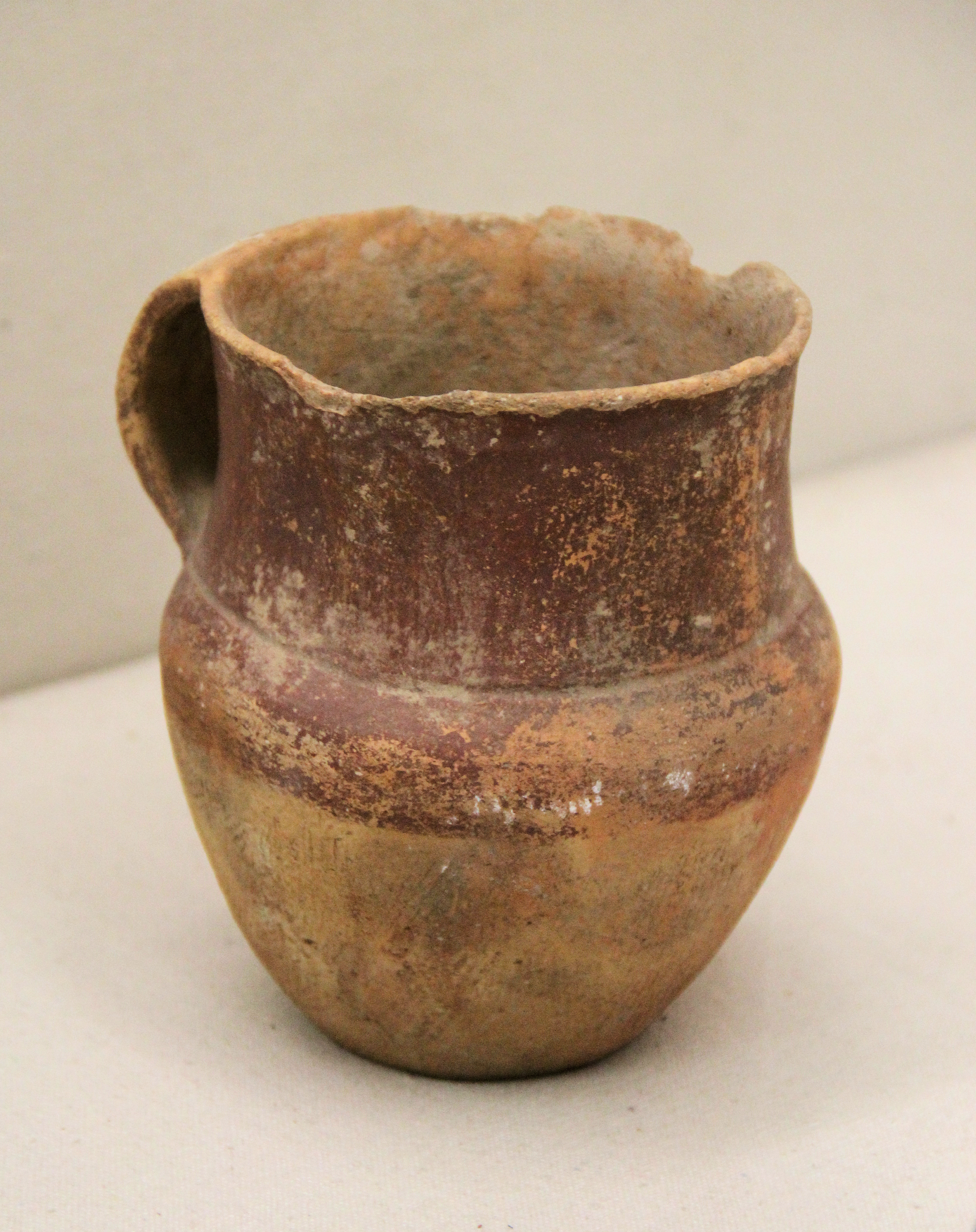
Shajing Culture Pottery

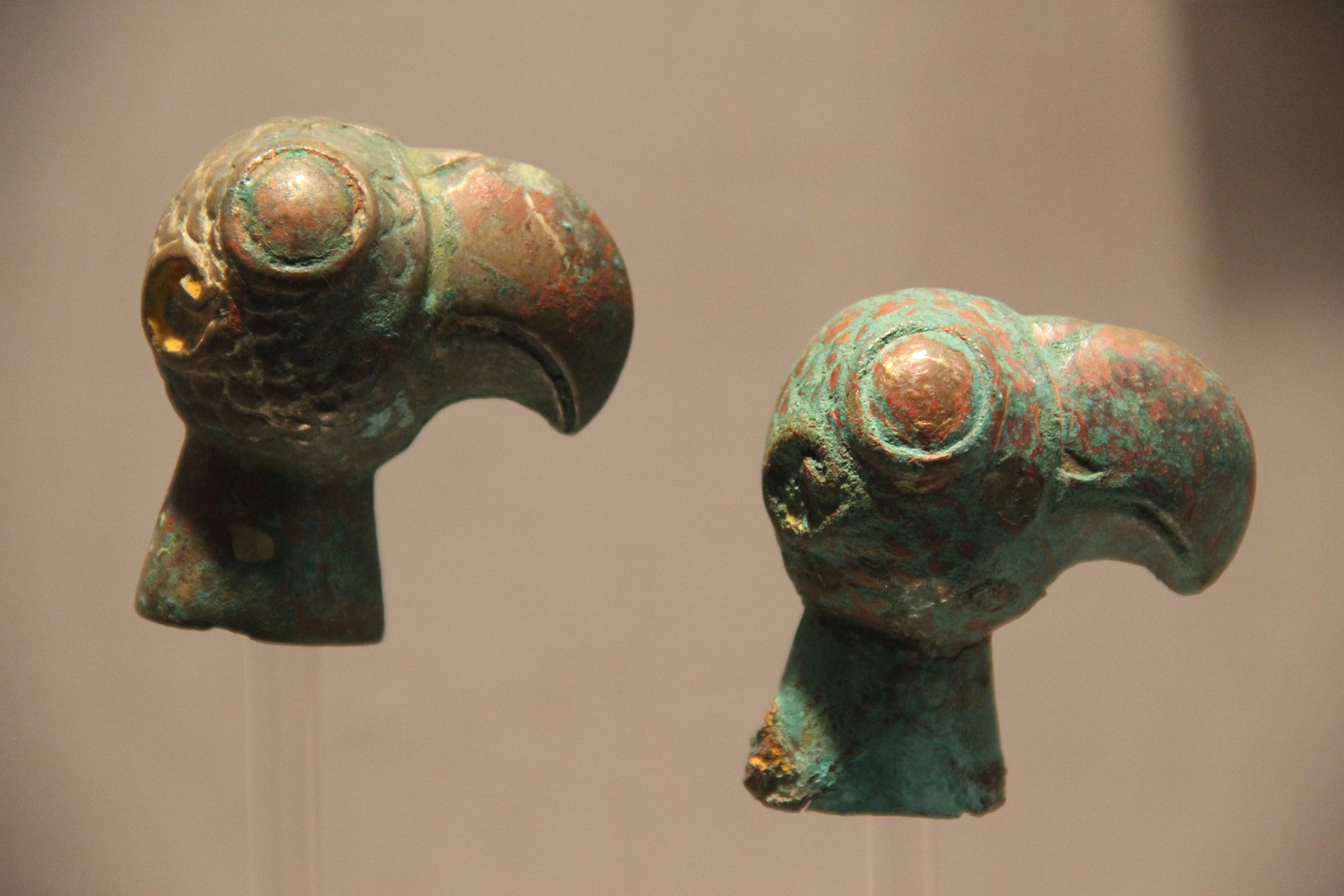
Shajing Culture Bronze Eagle Head Ornaments

== Final period ==
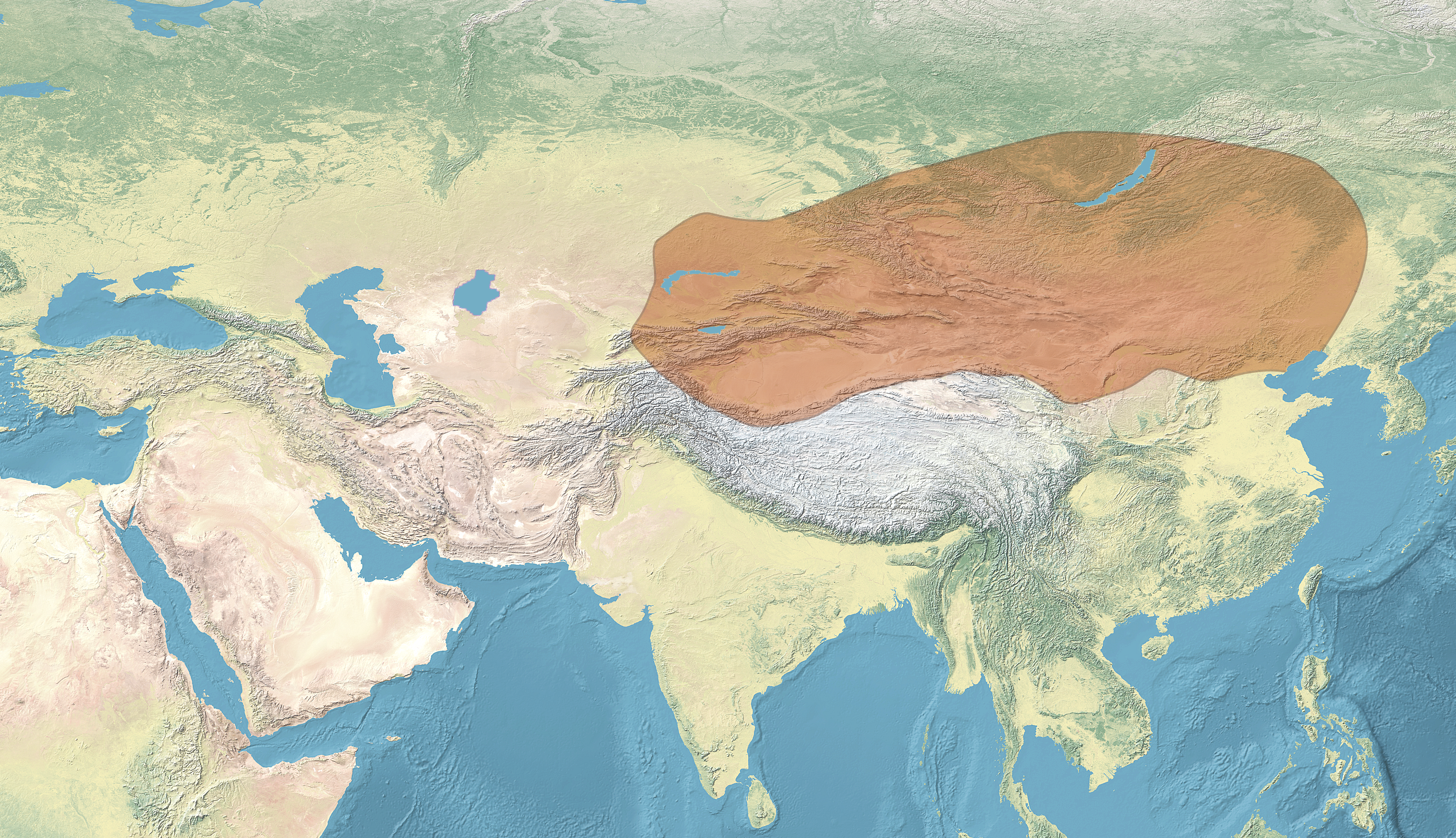
The Shajing culture became part of the territory of the Xiongnu Empire in the 2nd century BCE (before the Han–Xiongnu War of 133 BCE), and was ruled by king Xiutu.

In the final centuries, the Shajing culture was bordered to the south by the first Great Wall built by King Zhao of Qin in 271 BCE, and by the Xirong Majiayuan culture which had been incorporated within it.

The Shajing culture was overrun by the Xiongnu circa 150 BCE, as they expanded westward following their victory over the Donghu. The Xiongu installed a king named Xiutu (休屠) for the south and another named Hunye (浑邪) for the northern area. Alternatively, Xiutu himself may not have been a Xiongnu, and may have already ruled when the Xiongnu invaded, since it is reported that his territory was occupied by the Xiongnu when they were pushed westward by the Han dynasty.

Xiutu was known for worshipping a golden statue, as reported in the Shiji which mentions "golden (or gilded) men used by the King of Xiutu to worship Heaven". According to Christoph Baumer and others, "it is conceivable that this 'Golden man' was a statue of the Buddha".

The area of the Shajing culture and the Hexi Corridor were conquered by general Huo Qubing of Han dynasty in 121 BCE, as part of the Han–Xiongnu War. The Xiongnu were defeated, and the Han captured king Xiutu's golden statue, transferring it to the Ganquan Temple near the Imperial Palace of Han Wudi. Chinese authorities incorporated the new territories into prefectures and counties, such as the Wuwei Prefecture. Numerous people were transferred from the Central Plains, to repopulate the Hexi Corridor.
