= Siba culture =

Bronze Age culture in Gansu, China, c. 1900–1500 BCE

- Siba culture and contemporary cultures and polities in Continental Asia
- Geographical range: Gansu, China
- Dates: 1900-1500 BCE.
- Preceded by: Majiayao culture (2,300–2,000 BCE); Qijia culture (2,200–1,600 BCE); Xichengyi culture (2,000–1,600 BCE)
- Followed by: Siwa culture (1350-650 BCE) Shanma culture (900–200 BCE); Shajing culture (800–200 BCE) Han Dynasty (202 BCE–220 CE)

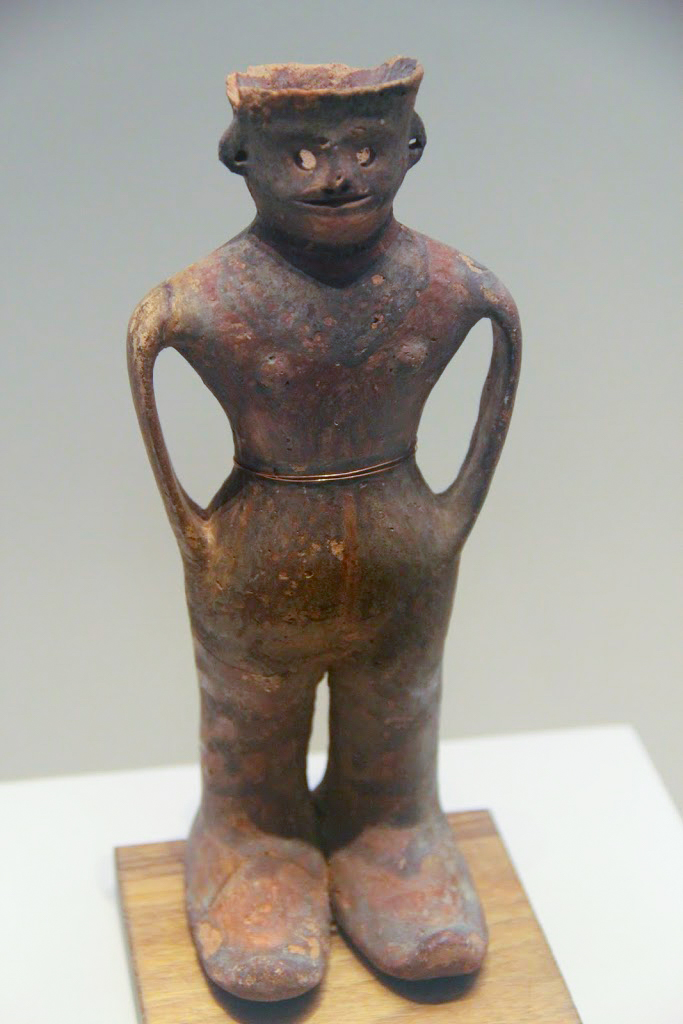
Painted pottery jar in shape of human, Siba Culture (1500-1300 BC), Gansu. National Museum of China

The Siba culture (Chinese: 四坝文化), also called Huoshaogou culture (火烧沟), was a Bronze Age archaeological culture that flourished circa 1900 to 1500 BC in the Hexi Corridor, in Gansu Province of Northwest China. It was discovered in 1984 at Sibatan in Shandan County. Siba type pottery vessels are different from the others in Gansu. Siba produced painted pottery with coloured decorations; these were painted after the vessels had been fired. Similar pottery was used by the Tianshanbeilu culture at Hami basin to the west.

== Characteristics ==
The Siba engaged in agricultural activities like millet farming and pig farming. Their metallurgy was highly developed.

Siba culture is found mainly to the west of the Gansu corridor. The locations are found at Yongchang, Minyue, Jiuquan, Yumen counties, and others. Siba culture is bordered by the Qijia culture to the east. The later period of Qijia is very close to Siba culture. The Siba culture may have developed independently.

The site of Ganguya in Jiuquan has been excavated.

Significant differences have been observed in the comparison of the burial customs and artifacts in the three sites excavated: Donghuishan, Huoshaogou and Ganguya.

"During the first two periods of the [Donghuishan] Cemetery, there were only arsenical copper articles, but by the third period, bronze articles came into being. In the Ganguya Cemetery which was later than the Donghuishan Cemetery, more than sixty-five percent of the copper samples was tested bronze articles."

== Influences ==
Siba culture played an intermediary role between the cultures to the east and west. There were also contacts with the Eurasian steppe. Research indicates that there was close interaction between agricultural and pastoral/hunting communities in this wide geographical area; pastoral/hunting communities also possessed many metal artefacts.

The cultures of West Asia and Central Asia spread eastward as early as the late Neolithic period and the early Bronze Age, when bronze technology, pottery and ornamation styles were introduced to the early cultures of China, such as the Siba culture (about 2000-1600 BCE), the Qijia culture (2500-1500 BCE), the Chawuhugoukou culture (around 800-100 BCE) or the Subeshi culture (1100-100 BCE).

Many of the artifacts of the Siba culture are thought to have derived from the Seima-Turbino culture of the Altai Mountains area.

== Artifacts ==
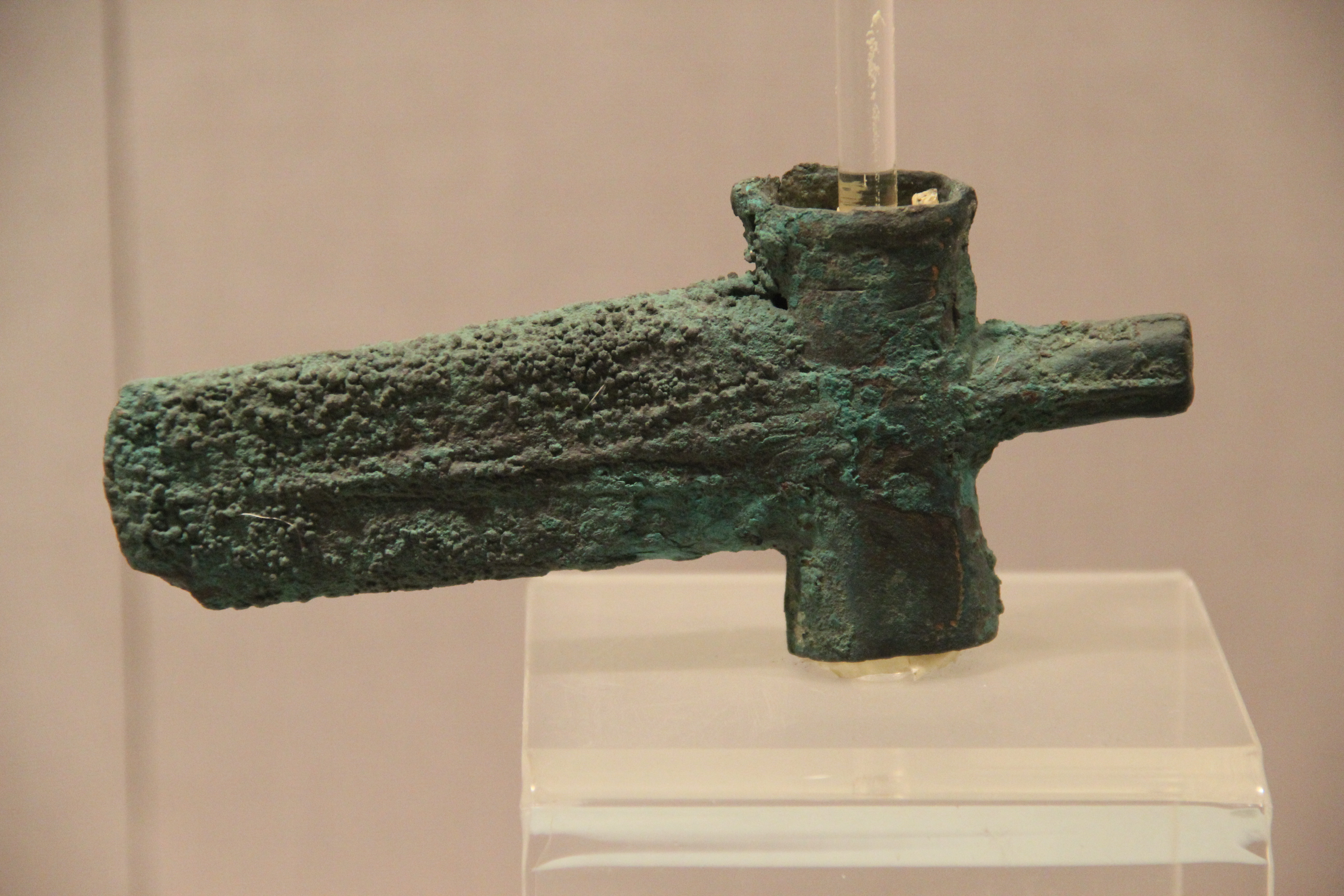
Bronze Qi axe, Siba Culture

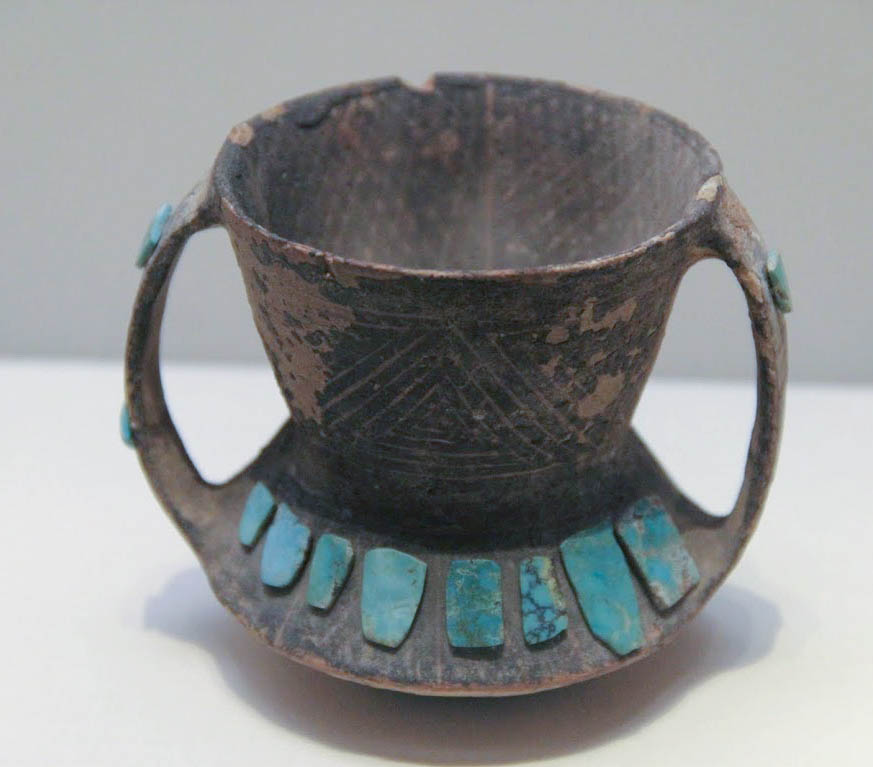
Pottery jar inlaid with turquoise, Siba Culture, Gansu.

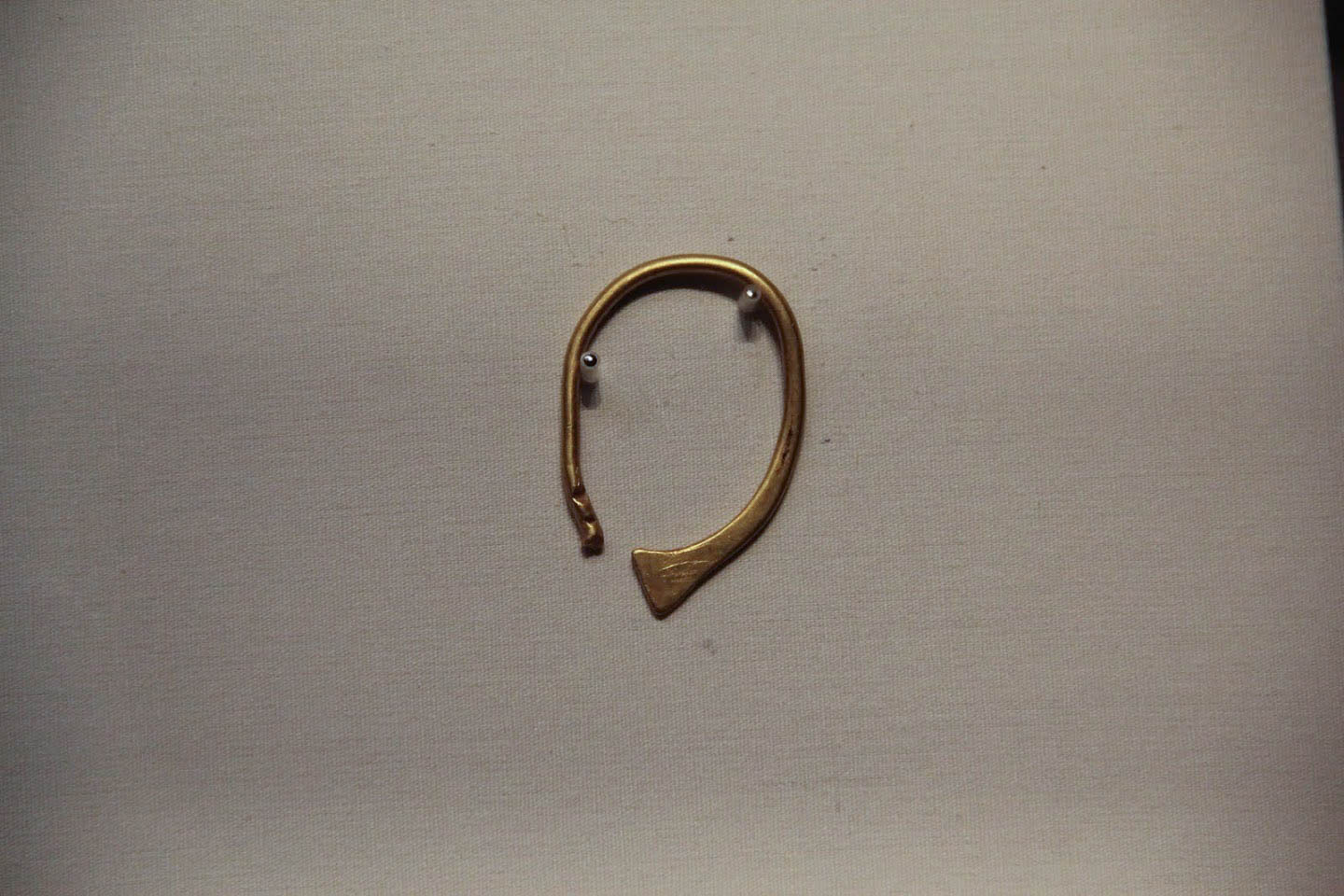
Gold earring, Siba culture, Gansu.

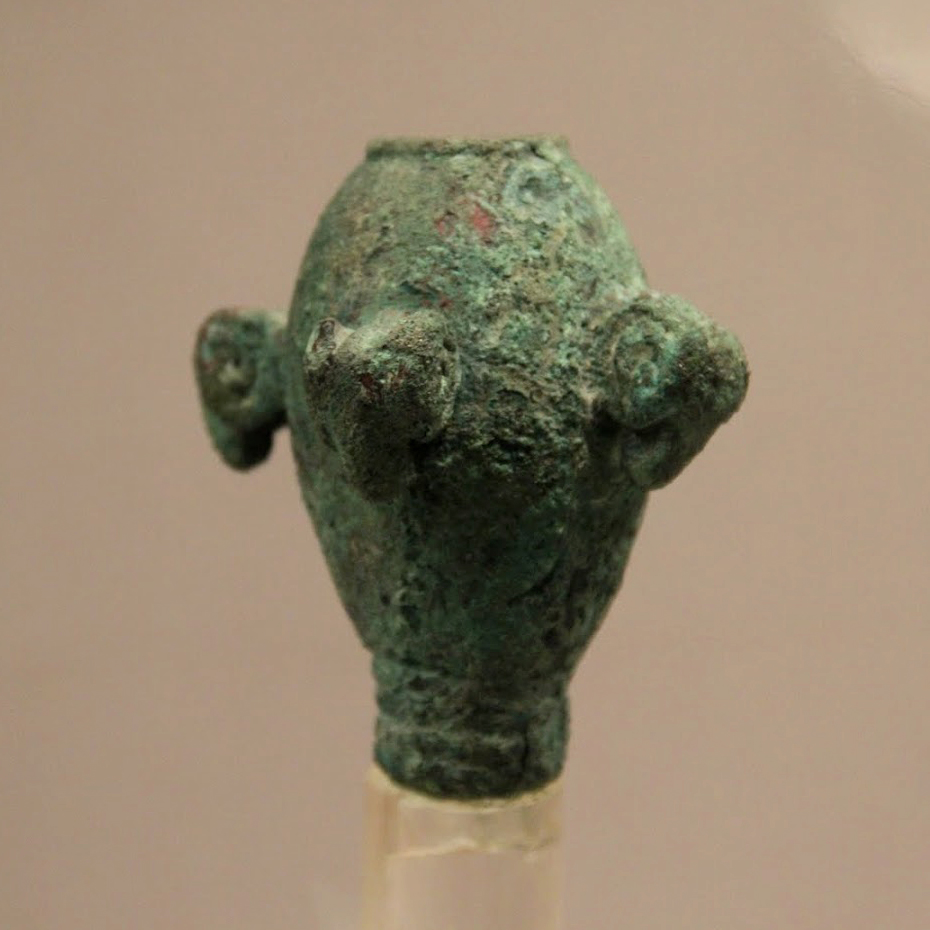
Bronze mace head with 4 ram heads, Siba Culture, 1900-1400 BC. Probably derived from the Seima-Turbino culture.

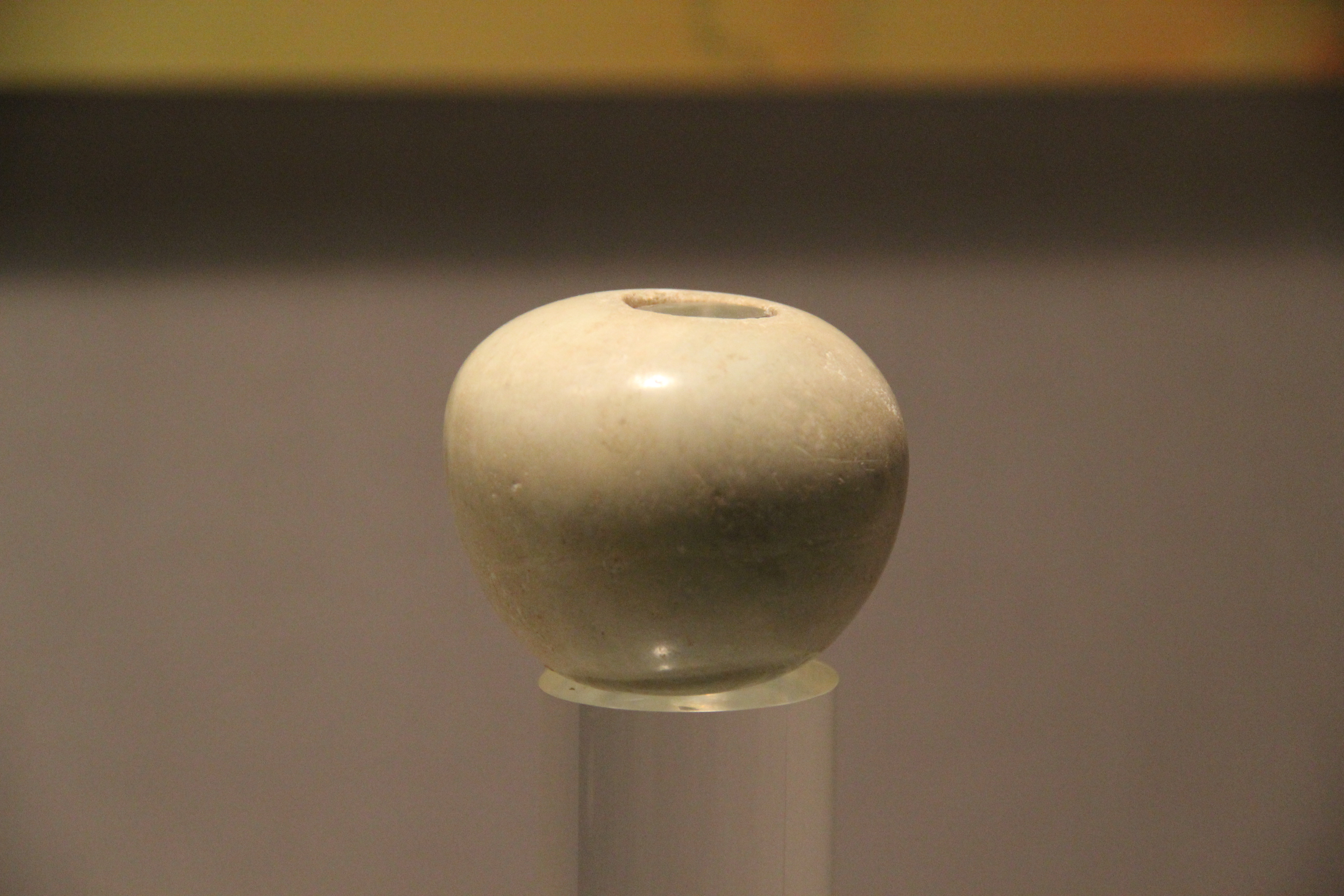
Stone macehead, Siba culture. Probably derived from the Seima-Turbino culture.

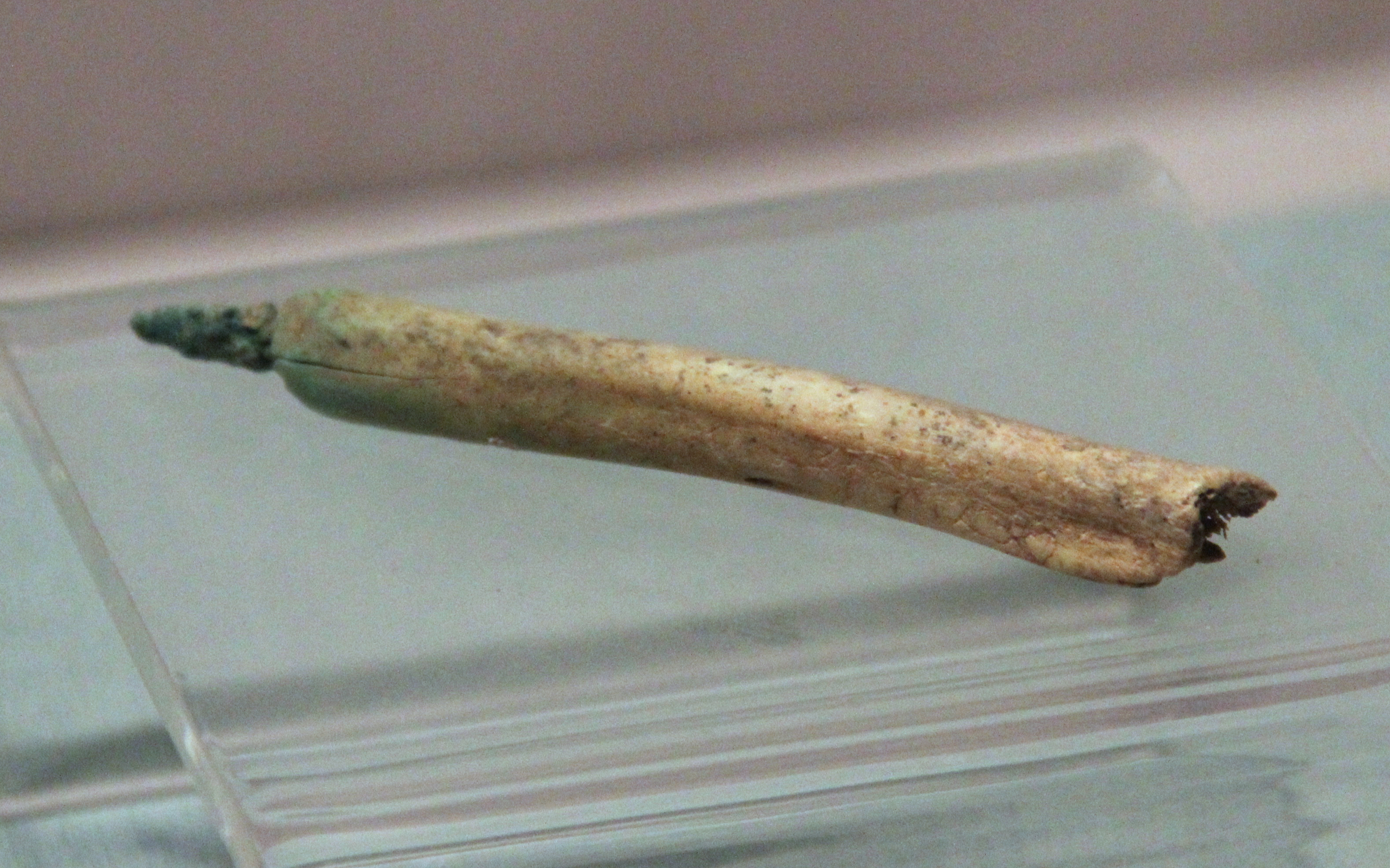
Bronze awl with bone handle.Probably derived from the Seima-Turbino culture.
