= Xichengyi culture =

Bronze Age culture in Gansu, China, c. 900–200 BCE

- Xichengyi culture and contemporary cultures and polities in Continental Asia
- Geographical range: Gansu, China
- Dates: 2,000-1,600 BCE
- Major sites: Xichengyi, Ganggangwa, Huoshiliang
- Preceded by: Majiayao culture (3,300–2,000 BCE)
- Followed by: Siba culture (1,600–1,300 BCE); Shajing culture (800–200 BCE); Han Dynasty (202 BCE–220 CE)

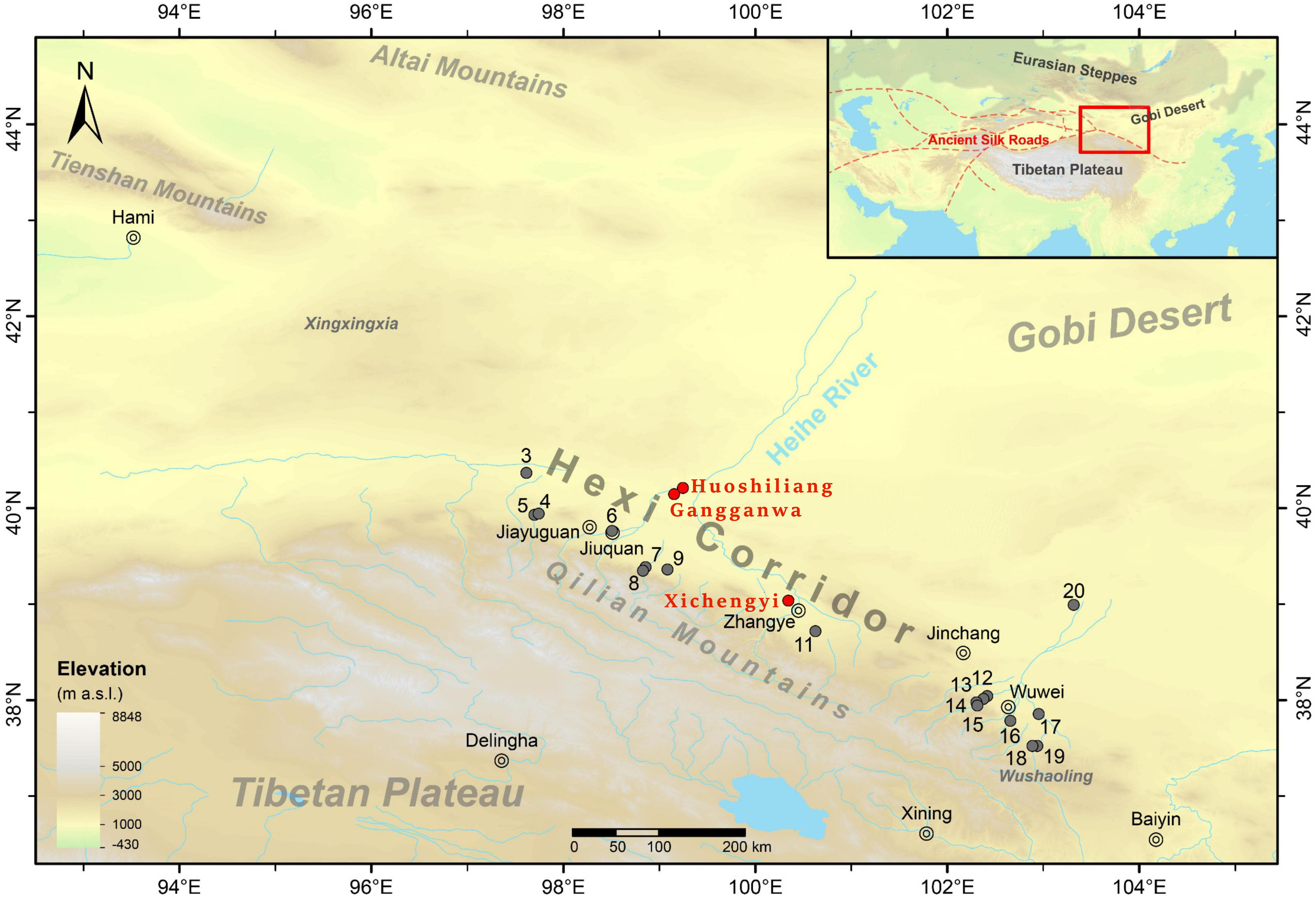
Xichengyi sites (red)

The Xichengyi culture (Ch:西城驿文化) was an ancient culture in the central Heihe River region of the Hexi Corridor, from 2,000 to 1,600 BCE. It is contemporary with the Qijia culture to its southeast. It succeeded the Majiayao culture (2,300–2,000 BCE) in the area, and preceded the Siba culture.

Some of its important archaeological sites are Xichengyi, Ganggangwa (where there are also some earlier Machang culture remains), and Huoshiliang (exclusively Xichengyi culture).

The Xichengyi culture practiced bronze smelting extensively, as seen by the quantity of slabs and furnace material (adobe constructions with blast pipes). The copper ore was from the neighbouring Beishan Mountain.

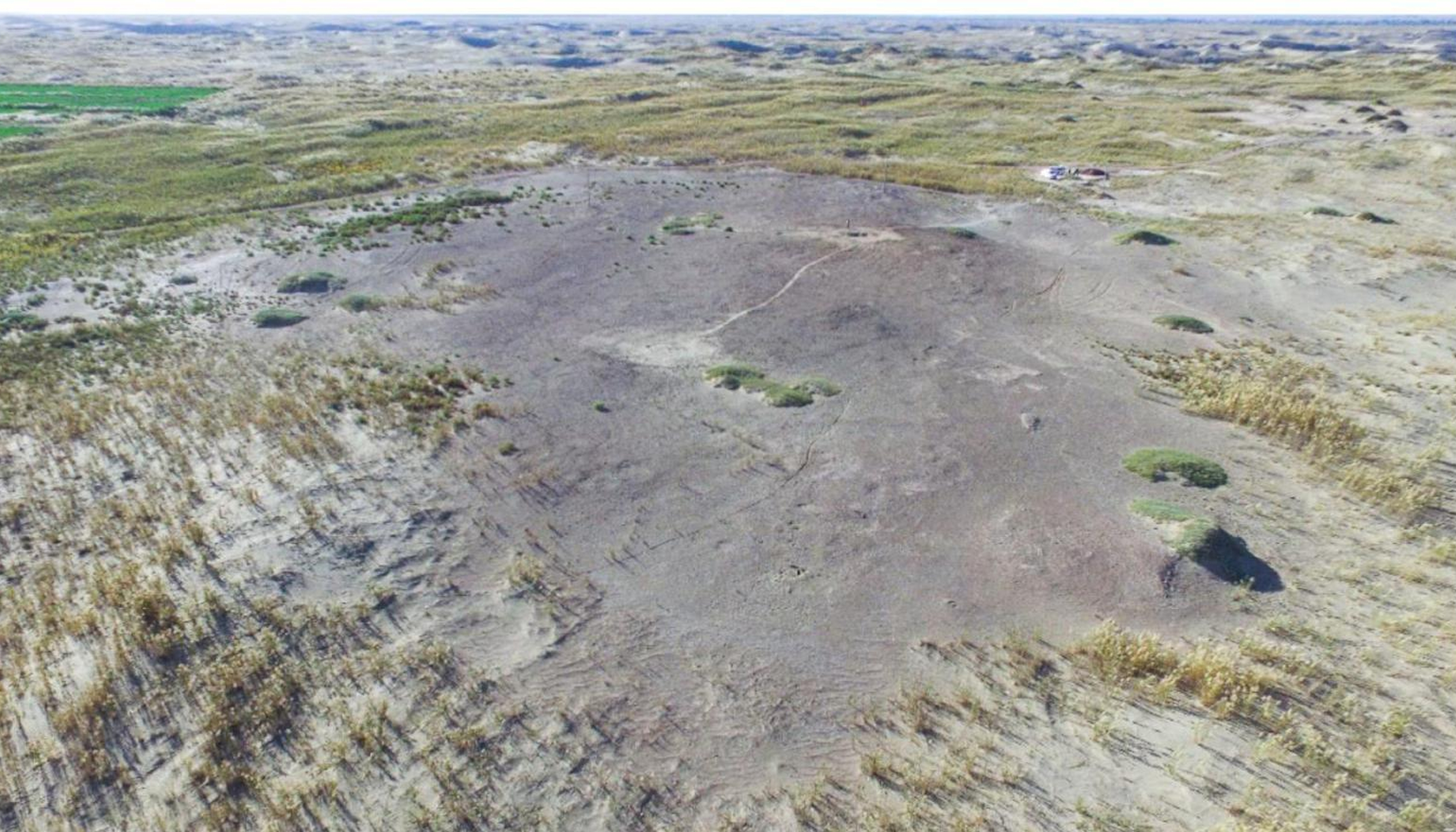
Huoshiliang site, EBA 2000-1600 BCE

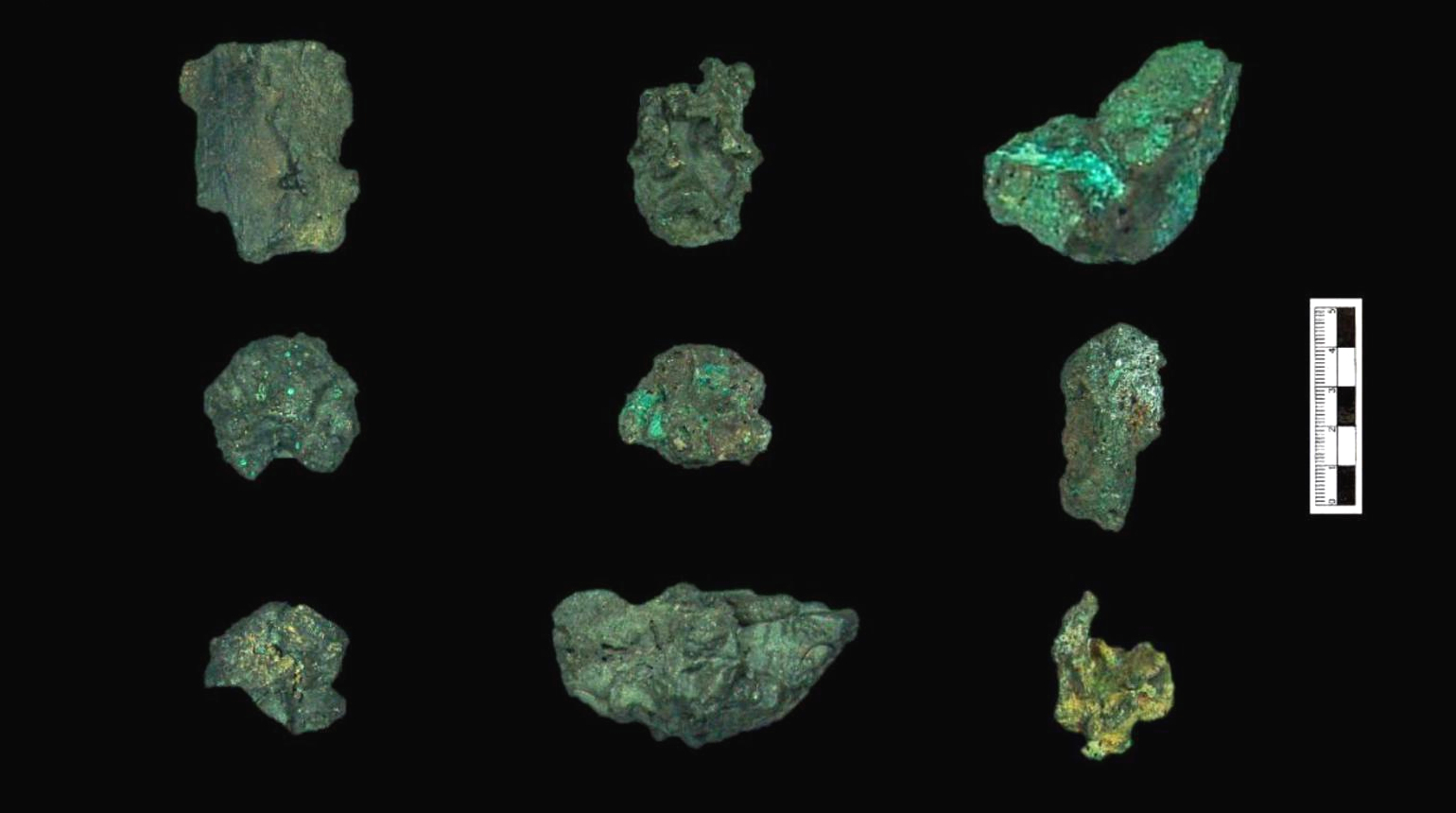
Huoshiliang bronze slabs, 2000-1600 BCE

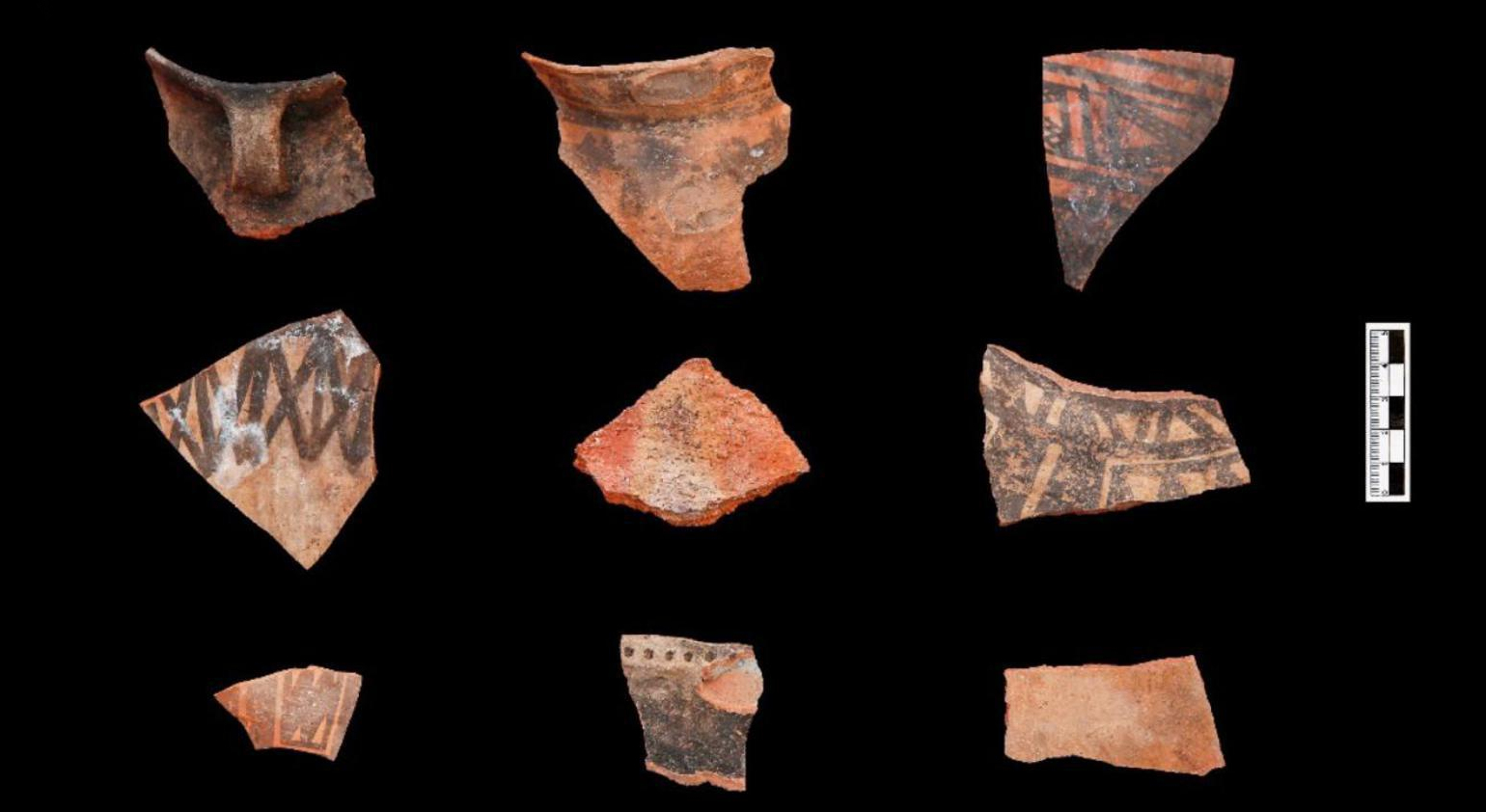
Huoshiliang pottery shards, Xichenyi culture, 2000-1600 BCE

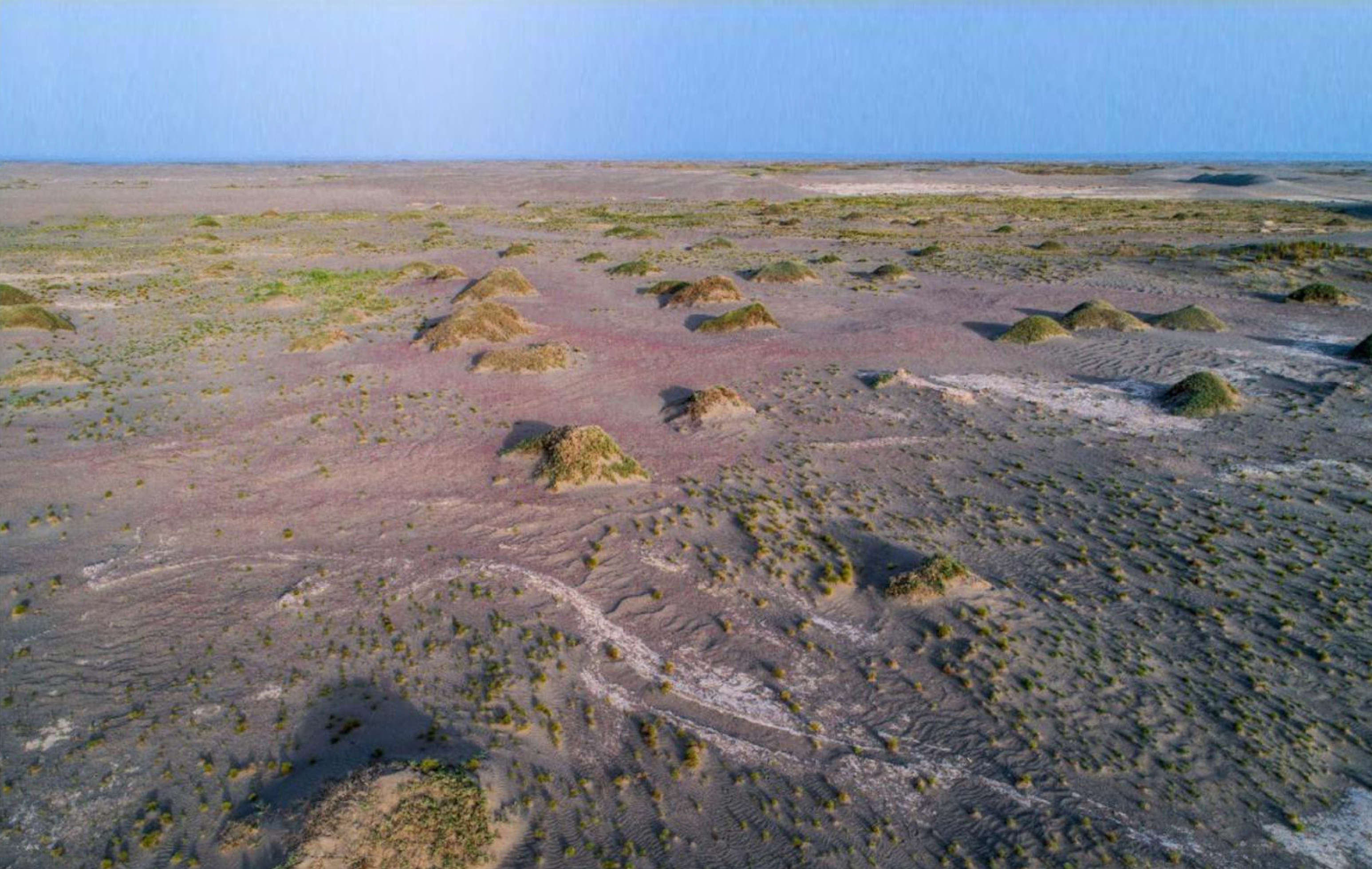
Ganggangwa site

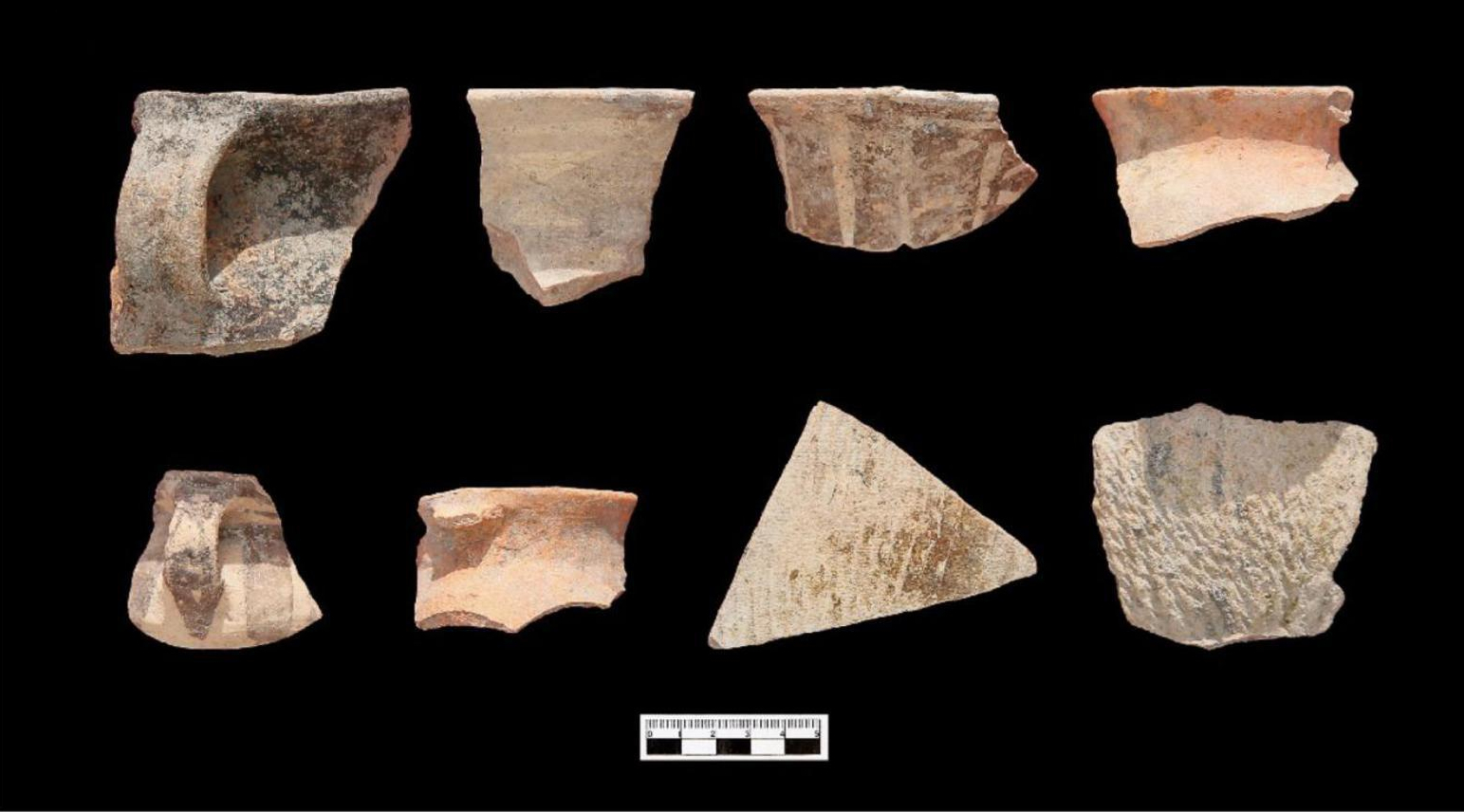
Ganggangwa site pottery shards, Xichengyi culture, 2000-1600 BCE

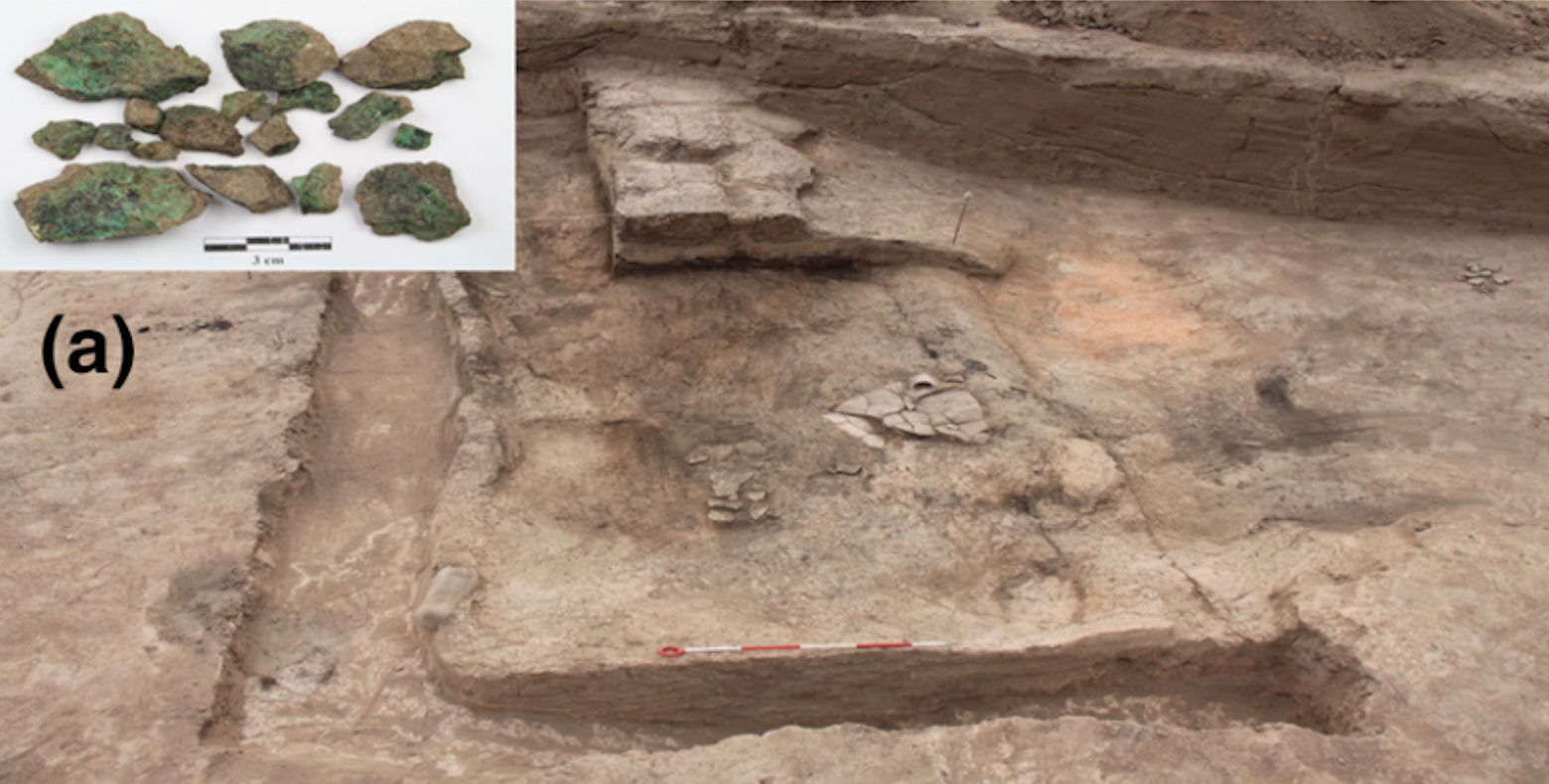
Xichengyi adobe building and bronze slabs.

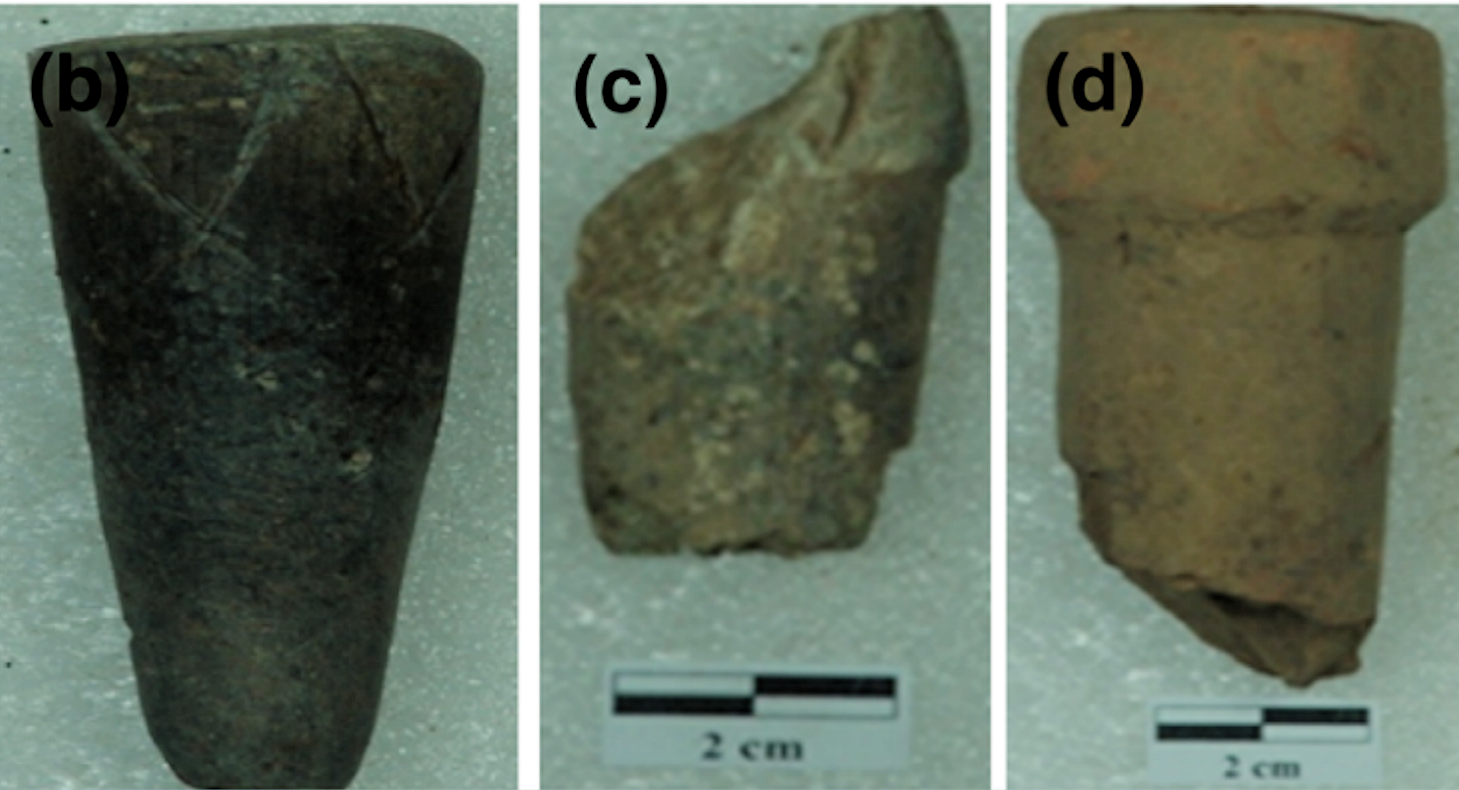
Xichengyi blast pipes.
