= Chaodaogou culture =

Bronze Age archeological culture in China

Chaodaogou culture (Chinese 抄道溝, Chaodaogou Wenhua) was a late Bronze Age nomadic archeological culture in the northern Hebei, Shanxi, Shaanxi, and Henan provinces of China, its center is located between the bend of the river Hunahe and the drainage basin of the Liao 遼/辽 river. Chaodaogou culture is cautiously dated to c. the 9th to 8th centuries BCE, falling within Western Zhou period of the Central Plain (Zhongyuan) area (in the middle and lower course of the Yellow River). The type site of the culture is Chaodaogou in Qinglong county, Hebei, excavated in May 1961. Another typical site of this culture is a cemetery in Linzheyu (林遮峪) in Baode county, Shaanxi. The Chaodaogou culture is roughly contemporary with the fishing and hunting nomadic Baijinbao culture in Heilongjiang.

The Chaodaogou culture is mostly characterized by funerary sites with identical or closely related objects, the grave inventory contains the most characteristic bronze weapons of daggers, knives, and axes, that have greatly contributed to defining the "Northern Zone" as a distinct cultural complex. The grave inventory points to a developed horse husbandry culture, the objects include horse harness, These are a dagger with decorated handle and ram-head pommel, an axe with tubular socket, small rattles and small bells in bronze, knives with arched back and a rattle pommel, knife with a ram-head knob, dagger with grooved hilt and rattle pommel, bronze belt plaques with spiral designs, and bronze ritual vessels.

The axes with tubular socket are clearly different from the fan-shaped axe of the Shang, the tubular hafting system is very different from the predominant Shang method of attaching handle to a protruding flat tang, the main characteristic of the tubular hafting system is a tubular socket set perpendicularly to the blade. Tubular axes were excavated at the archeological sites in Hebei and Shanxi provinces, and at Shang sites of the Central Plain, and in eastern Liaoning

The elements of the Chaodaogou bronze culture peculiar to the Northern Zone are present as far as Baikal area, Mongolia, Altai region, South Siberia (Minusinsk river basin), and Tuva, evincing the extraordinary reach of this cultural complex. Excavation of archaeological sites in North China allowed to identify a number of cultures or cultural features located within the Northern Zone complex. In addition to the Chaodaogou culture, they are also characteristic to the Lower Xiajiadian and Baijinbao cultures in the northeast; the Zhukaigou culture, together with mixed Shang and Northern Zone sites, in the north-central sector; and the Qijia, Xindian, and Siwa cultures in the northwestern portion, including the present-day Gansu and Ningxia provinces.

== Literature ==
- Wang Binghua, A Preliminary Analysis of the Archeological Cultures of the Bronze Age in the Region of Xinjiang//Anthropology & Archeology of Eurasia, Vol. 34, No 4, Spring 1996, DOI 10.2753/AAE1061-1959340467
- The Cambridge History of Ancient China, M. Loeuwe, E.L. Shaughnessy, eds., Cambridge University Press, 1999, ISBN 978-0-521-47030-8
