= Honggu Town =

Honggu 红古镇
- Town
- Interactive map of Honggu
- Country: China
- Province: Gansu
- Prefecture-level city: Lanzhou
- District: Honggu

Area
  - Total: 163.02 km^{2} (62.94 sq mi)

Population
  - Total: 13,490

Honggu is a town of Honggu District, Lanzhou, Gansu, China. Although Honggu District is named after the town, it is not the district seat.

Located along the Huangshui River valley, most of the population lives in the fertile river plain.

The town is divided in 8 villages and one residential community: Xuanzi, Wangjiakou, Mijiatai, Xuejia, Shuichewan, Xinjian, Honggu, and Xinzhuang.
