= Suzhi =

Suzhi may refer to:

- Suzhi (crater), impact crater on Mars
- Suzhi (苏志墓地), Bronze Age necropolis of the Kayue culture in present-day Qinghai, China
