= Xindian culture =

Bronze Age culture in China

- Location of Xindian, with contemporary cultures in 1000 BCE
- Geographical range: Gansu
- Dates: ca. 1500–1000 BCE
- Preceded by: Qijia culture
- Followed by: Shajing culture (800-200 BCE); Majiayuan (3rd-2nd c.BCE)

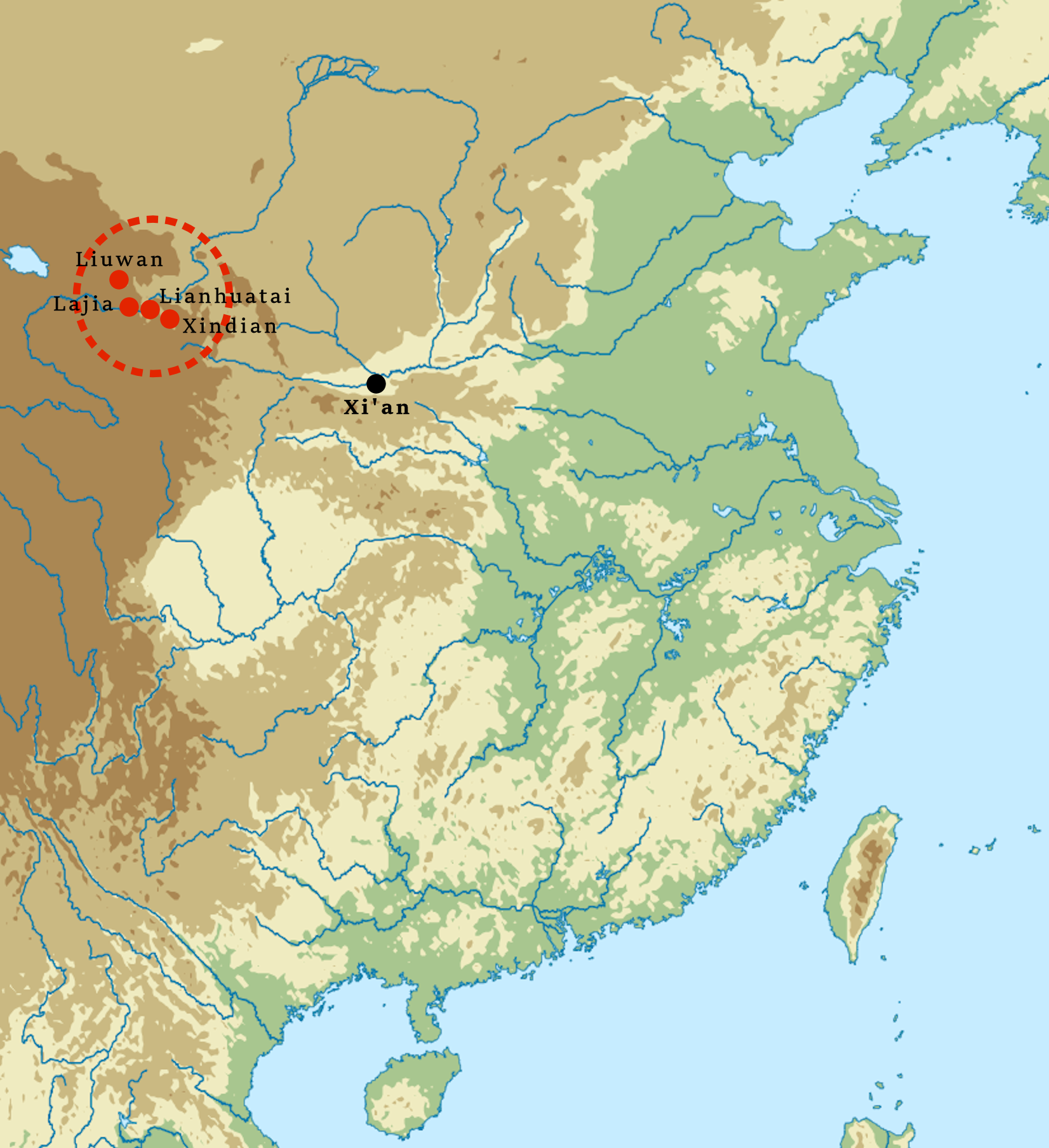
Xindian culture map

Xindian culture (Chinese: 辛店文化; pinyin: Xīndiàn wénhuà) was a Bronze Age culture in the Gansu and Qinghai provinces of China. Xindian culture is dated ca. 1500–1000 BCE, a radiocarbon testing of an artefact produced a date around 1000 BCE, which roughly corresponds to the Western Zhou period of the Central Plain area (in the middle and lower course of the Yellow River).

== Geography ==
The Xindian culture is named after a site discovered by swedish archaeologist Johan Gunnar Andersson in 1924 in Xindian, Lintao County, Gansu. The culture was mainly located in Gansu in the middle and lower course of the Tao River and Daxia River, and in Qinghai in the basin of the Huangshui River.

== Cultural context ==
Xindian culture was predominantly agricultural, with breeding pigs and cattle, at the sites of the culture were found bronze castings and traces of copper smelting production. Some small bronzes have been discovered at Huizui in Lintao county. They include knives, awls and buttons.

Xindian culture belongs to the painted pottery cultures found in Central Asia, India, and China, among others. Xindian culture postdates the Qijia culture; the pottery evidence demonstrates a cultural continuity, though genetically it is not related with it.

The shape of some Xindian culture pottery vessels, as well as the decorative patterns on pottery reveal correlations with the Tangwang culture.

In the same area in close proximity are distributed early sites of the contemporary neighboring Siwa culture, though Xindian culture and Siwa culture followed their own paths of development. The later Xindian culture expanded westward and came closer to the Kayue culture, it was possibly absorbed by the Kayue culture.

== Discovery and type site ==
The Xindian culture is named after its type site at Xindian (Hsin Tien) in present-day Lintao County, Gansu. Johan Gunnar Andersson described Xindian as a market town in the Tao River valley, located on the Lanzhou–Lintao route. The prehistoric remains were found on loess-covered river terraces east of the Tao River.

The principal site (designated Site "A" by Andersson) consisted of a cemetery situated north of a large ravine near the hamlet of Guojiazhuang. The site had an extent of 150 m. in a W-E and about the same in a N-S direction. Before the arrival of Andersson's expedition, local digging had already disturbed a large number of graves, yielding many of the painted pottery vessels that later became characteristic of the Xindian culture. Andersson's team excavated twenty-five burials and concluded that the cemetery provided a representative sample of the burial customs and pottery assemblage, although relatively few metal artefacts or other grave goods were recovered. The material is housed at the Museum of Far Eastern Antiquities in Stockholm.

Additional burials were identified at nearby locations, including a site east of Xindian village designated Xindian E.

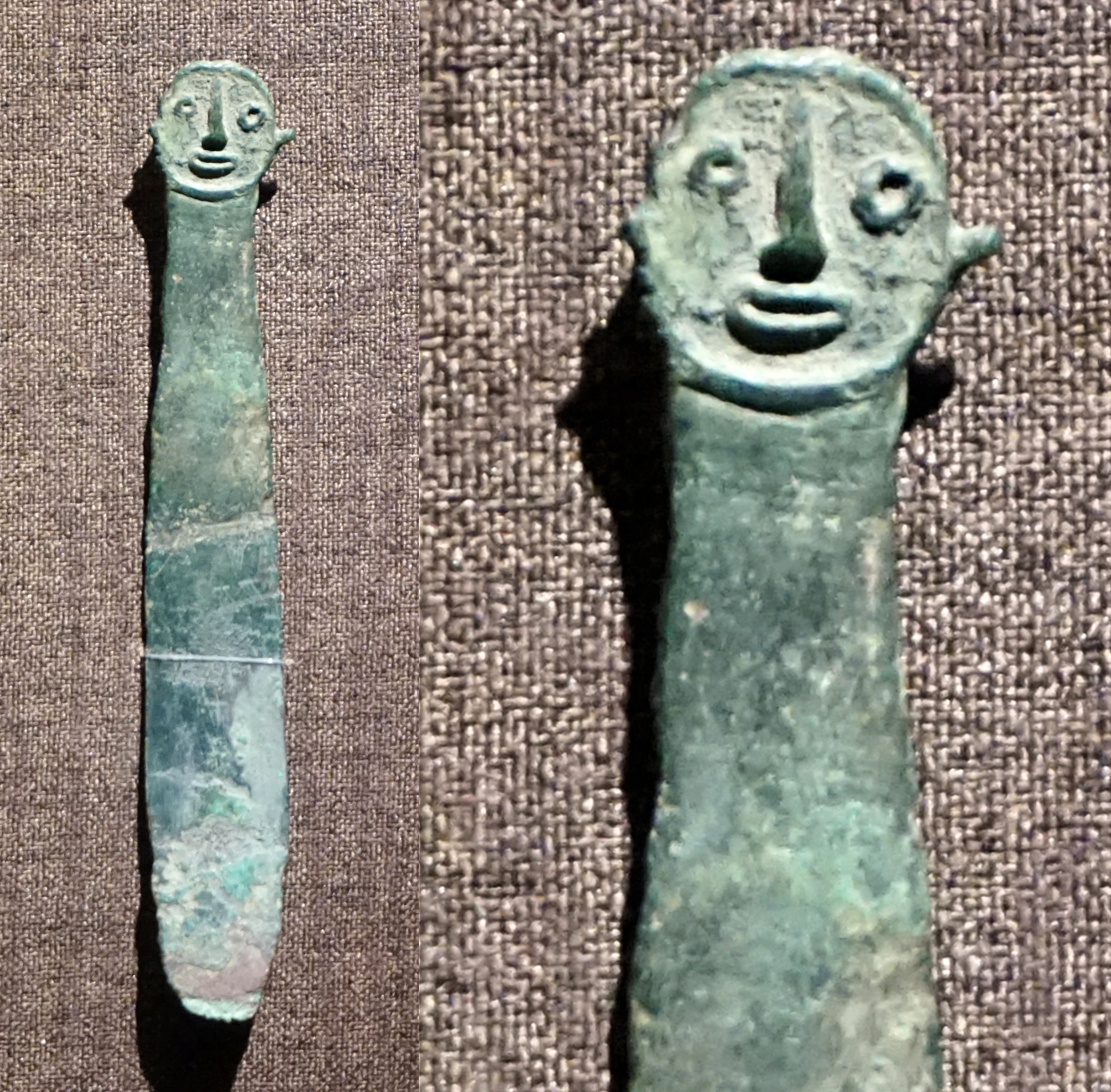
Anthropomorphic spatula, Xindian culture, 1900-1500 BCE. Gansu Museum

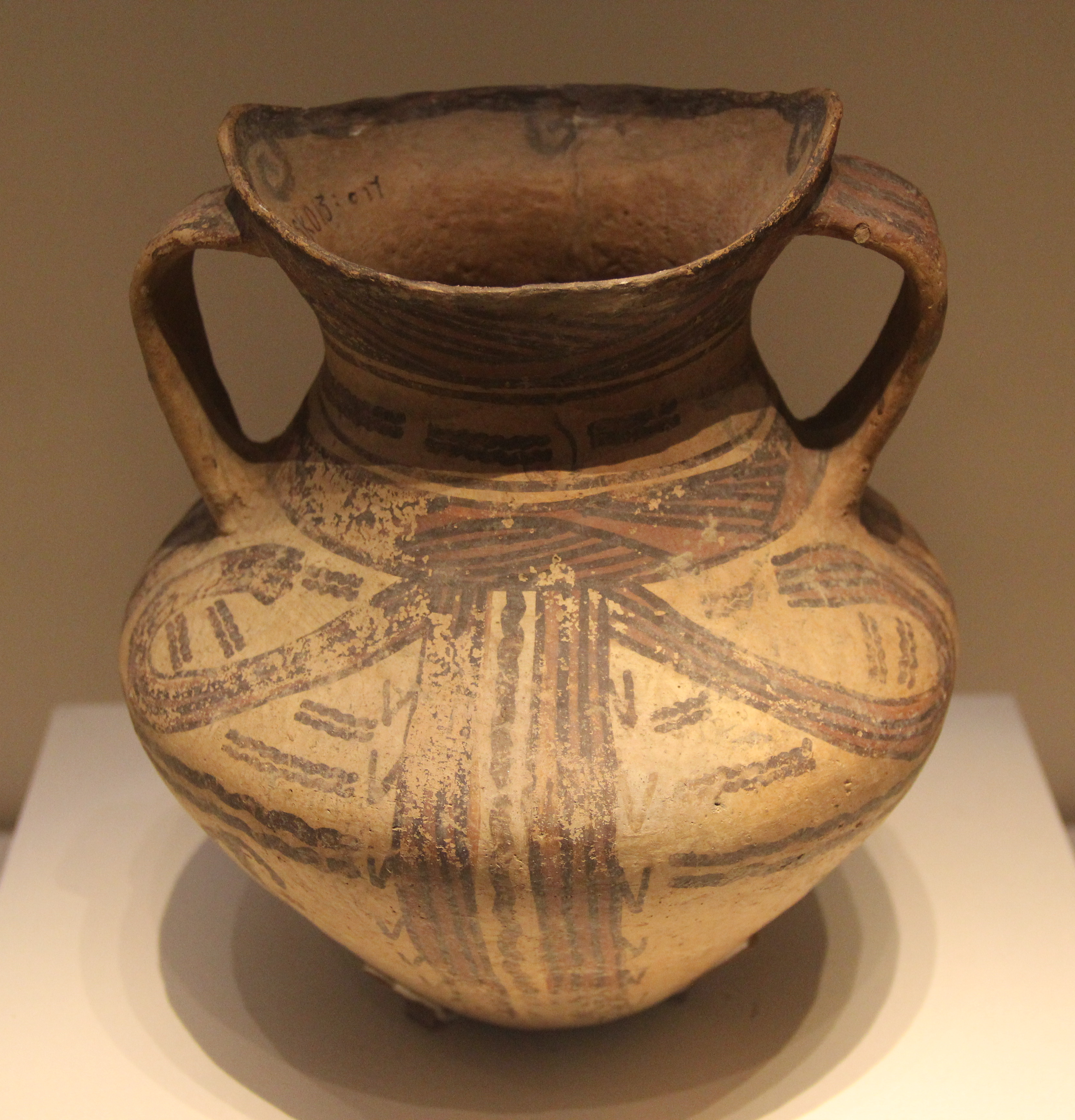
Xindian pottery jar

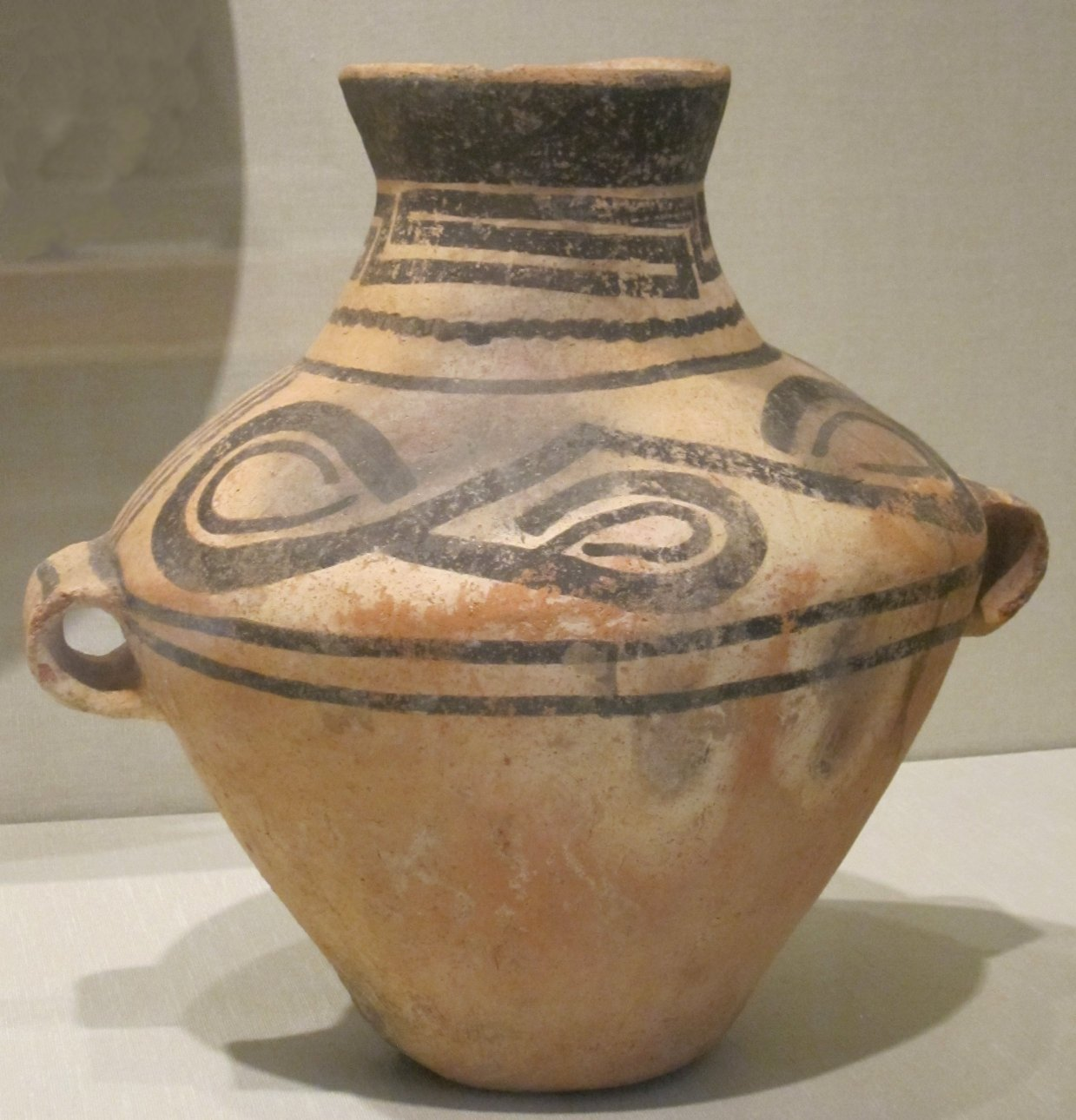
Xindian jar with two lug handles, Gansu, around 1,000 BCE, painted earthenware, Honolulu Academy of Arts

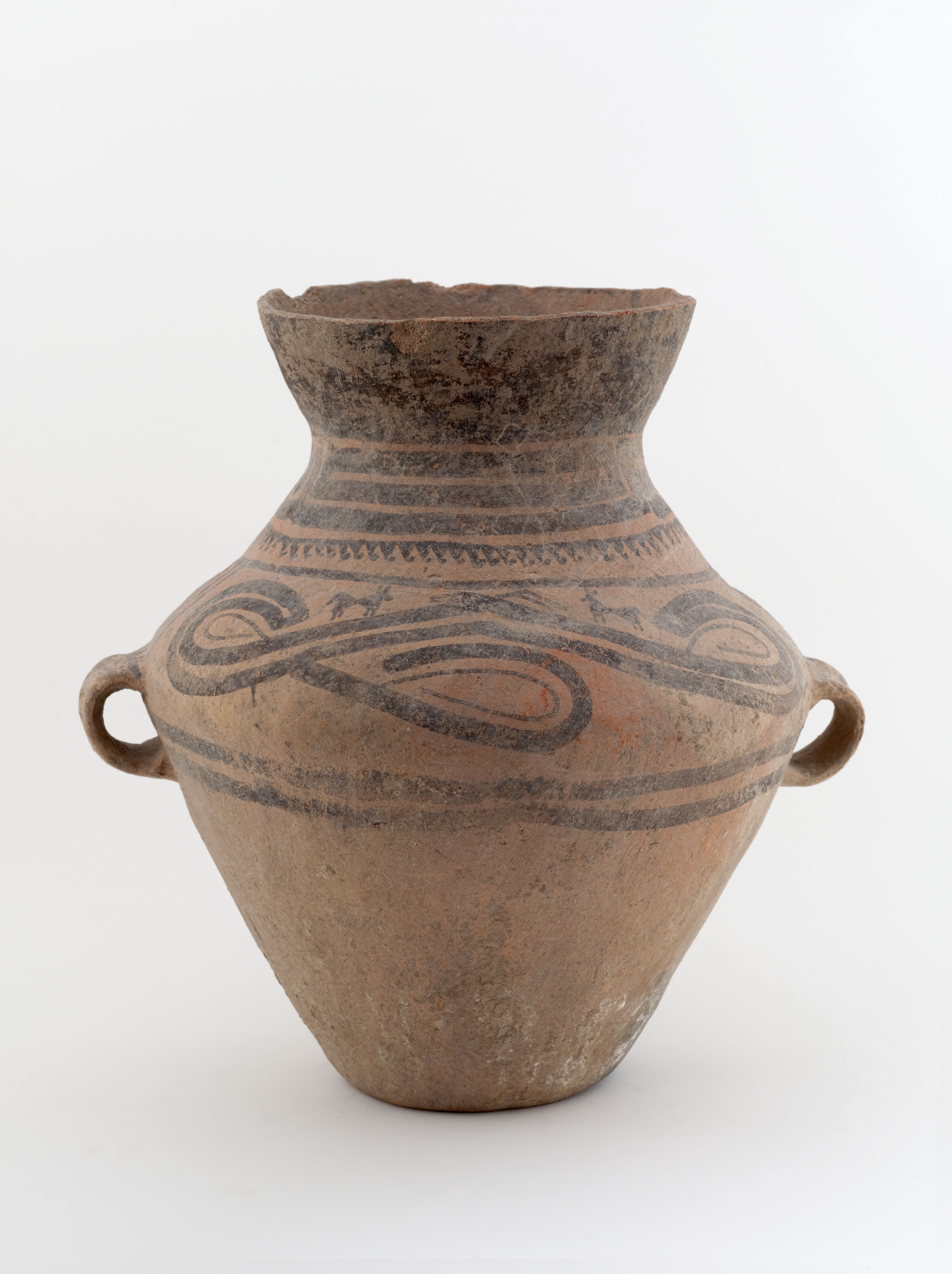
Jar, Xindian culture. Musée Cernuschi.

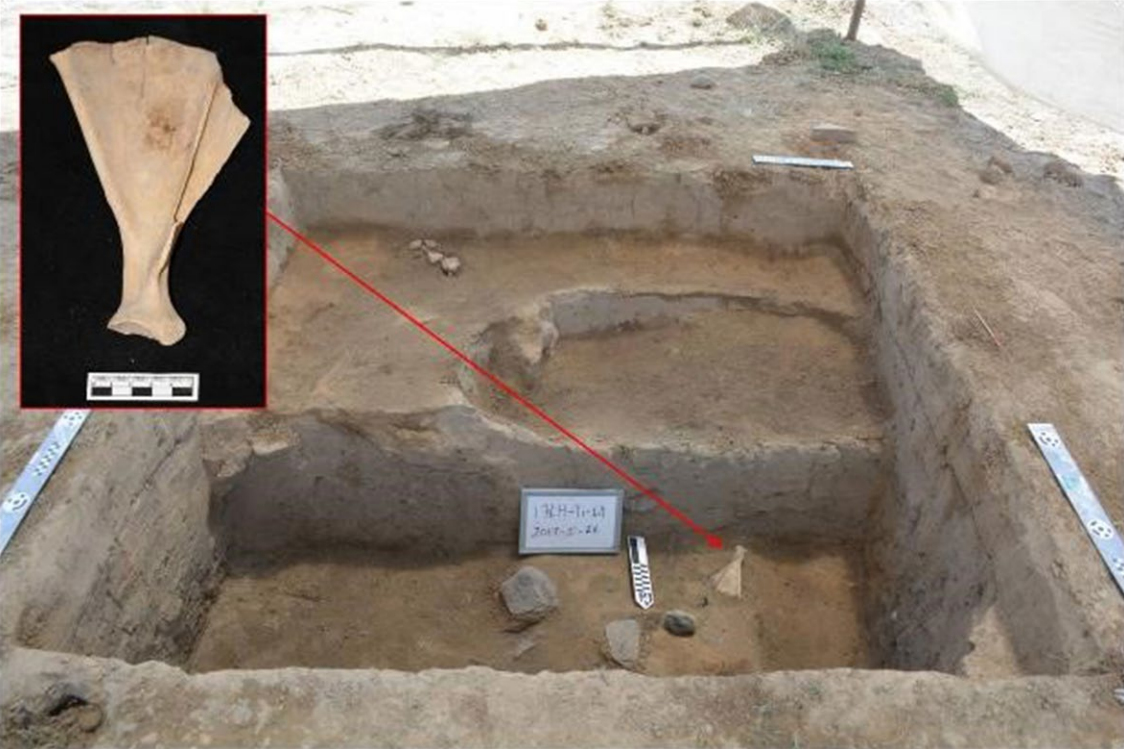
Xindian pit with oracle bone
