= Huangshui River =

River in the People's Republic of China

Coordinates: 36.1217°N 103.3619°E

The Huang Shui is shown combining with the Datong River just west of Lanzhou

The Huangshui River, Huang Shui, or Tsong Chu is a river in Qinghai and Gansu, China. It is a left tributary of the Yellow River and its total length is 374 km (232 mi) with a basin area of 3,200 km^{2} (1,200 sq mi).

== Etymology ==
The Huangshui River (Chinese: 湟水河; pinyin: Huángshuǐ hé) is also referred to simply as Huang Shui (Chinese: 湟水; pinyin: Huáng shuǐ) in China. The river was formerly romanized as the Hwong-Choui. In Amdo Tibetan, the Huangshui River is known as the Tsong Chu (Tibetan: ཙོང་ཆུ་).

== History ==
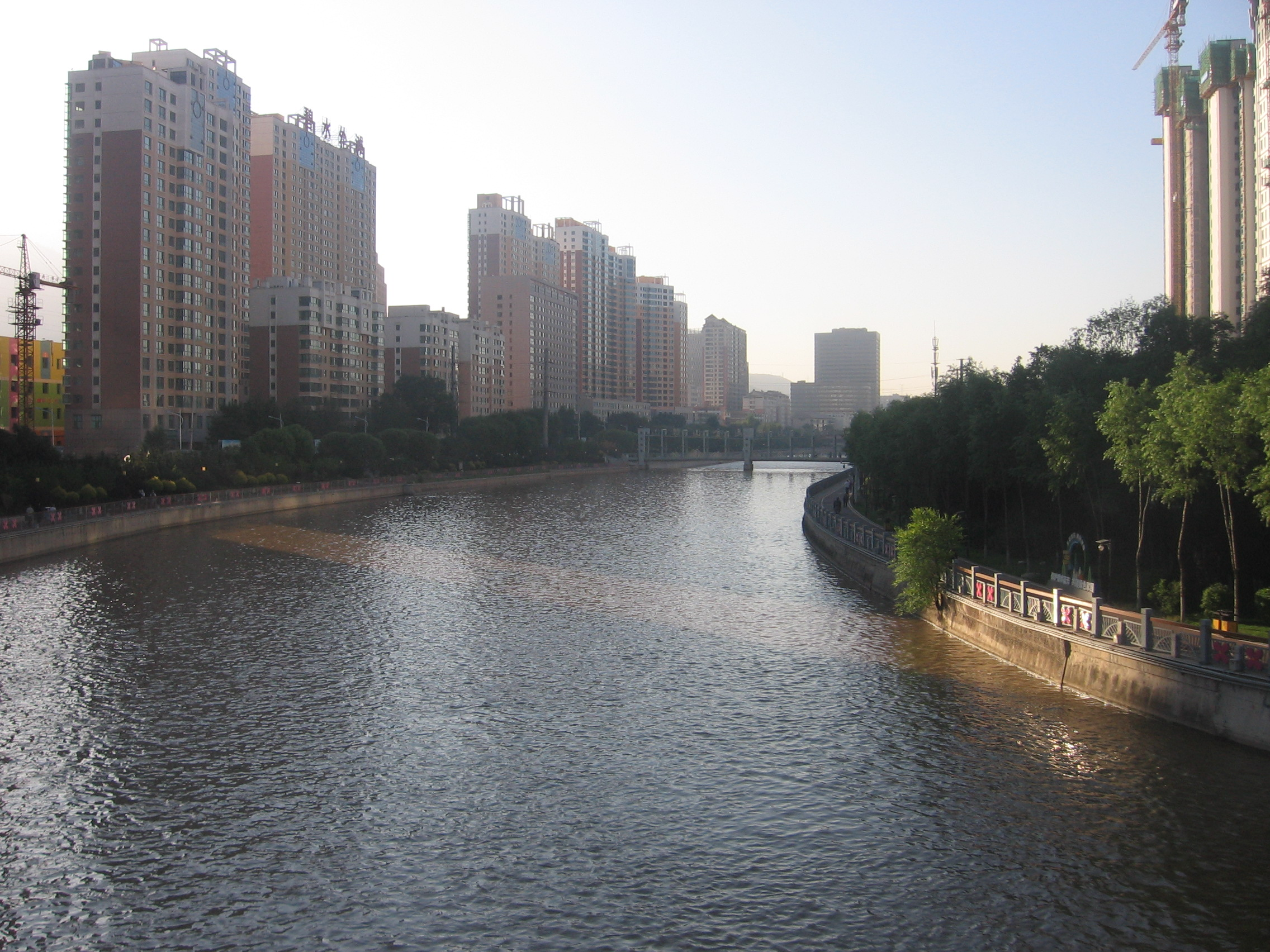
Huangshui River in Xining

The Huangshui River Valley, also known as Tsongkha (Tibetan: ཙོང་ཁ་), has long been important as a route between Chinese, Tibetan, and Mongolian cultures. As one of the few fertile valleys on the northeast edge of the Tibetan Plateau, the river's basin has supported agriculture for various Neolithic and Bronze Age civilizations including the Majiayao culture, Qijia culture, Xindian culture, and Kayue culture. Huangshui River Valley was also one of the routes utilized by travelers on the Northern Silk Road. The city of Xining formed on the Huangshui River due to its strategic importance.

== Geography ==
The Huangshui River, in name, is a short river that rises in Qinghai's Daban Mountains in Haiyan County, Haibei. The river flows east through Xining and Haidong before joining with the Yellow River just upstream from Lanzhou. The Huangshui's primary tributary, the Datong River, is actually longer in length than the Huangshui and thus forms the main stem. The Datong and Huangshui meet on the Qinghai-Gansu border between Minhe and Honggu.
