= Honggu, Lanzhou =

Coordinates: 36°21′06″N 102°52′57″E

Honggu 红古区
- District
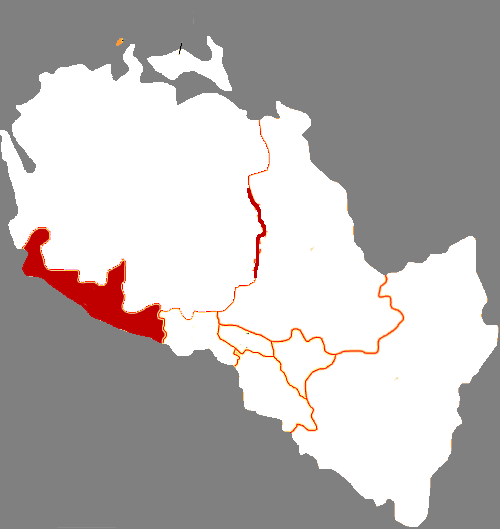
- Location in Lanzhou

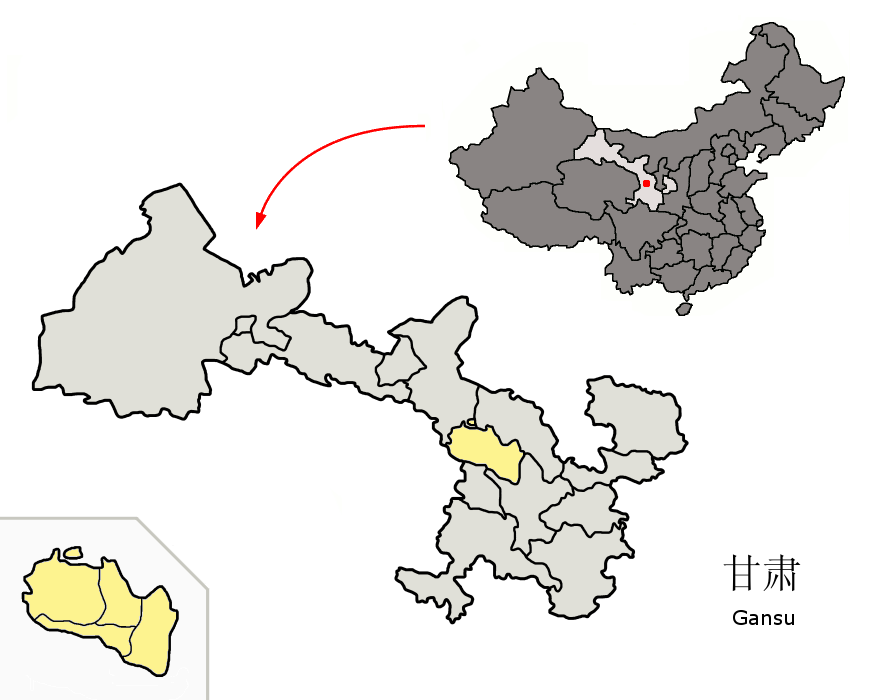
- Lanzhou in Gansu
- Country: China
- Province: Gansu
- Prefecture-level city: Lanzhou

Area
  - Total: 568 km^{2} (219 sq mi)
- Highest elevation: 2,462 m (8,077 ft)
- Lowest elevation: 1,580 m (5,180 ft)

Population (2019)
  - Total: 143,000
  - Density: 252/km^{2} (652/sq mi)
- Time zone: UTC+8 (China Standard)
- Postal code: 730084
- Website: www.honggu.gov.cn

Honggu District (simplified Chinese: 红古区; traditional Chinese: 紅古區; pinyin: Hónggǔ Qū) is one of five districts of the prefecture-level city of Lanzhou, the capital of Gansu Province, Northwest China. Although administratively part of Lanzhou, it is not part of the continuous built-up area of the city, and is located roughly equidistant between Lanzhou and Xining. Directly across the Huangshui River lies Minhe Hui and Tu Autonomous County in Qinghai.

The area of Honggu District has been inhabited since at least 5000 B.C. In 110 B.C., the area was captured by the Han dynasty army. In 1960, the district was split off from Xigu District, before then it had also been part of both Yongdeng County en Gaolan County. Until 1989, the county seat was in Yaojie, nowadays, Haishiwan is the county seat. Since the districts urban centre and government is not located in the town Honggu, the district is often referred to by locals as Haishiwan or Yaojie.

Honggu is rich in mineral resources such as coal, sand, gravel, petroleum, ores. During the first five-year plan of the PRC (1953–1957), coal mining was developed in the area. In 2011 its mineral resources were declared exhausted.

One of the first found Mamenchisaurus remains were found near Haishiwan in 1958.

== Administrative divisions ==
Honggu District is subdivided in 3 subdistricts and 4 towns, 34 administrative villages and 22 residential communities.

Subdistricts

- Yaojie Subdistrict (窑街街道)
- Xiayao Subdistrict (下窑街道)
- Kuangqu Subdistrict (矿区街道)

Towns

- Haishiwan Town (海石湾镇)
- Huazhuang Town (花庄镇)
- Ping'an Town (平安镇)
- Honggu Town (红古镇)

== See also ==
- List of administrative divisions of Gansu
