= Kayue culture =

Bronze Age culture in Northwest China

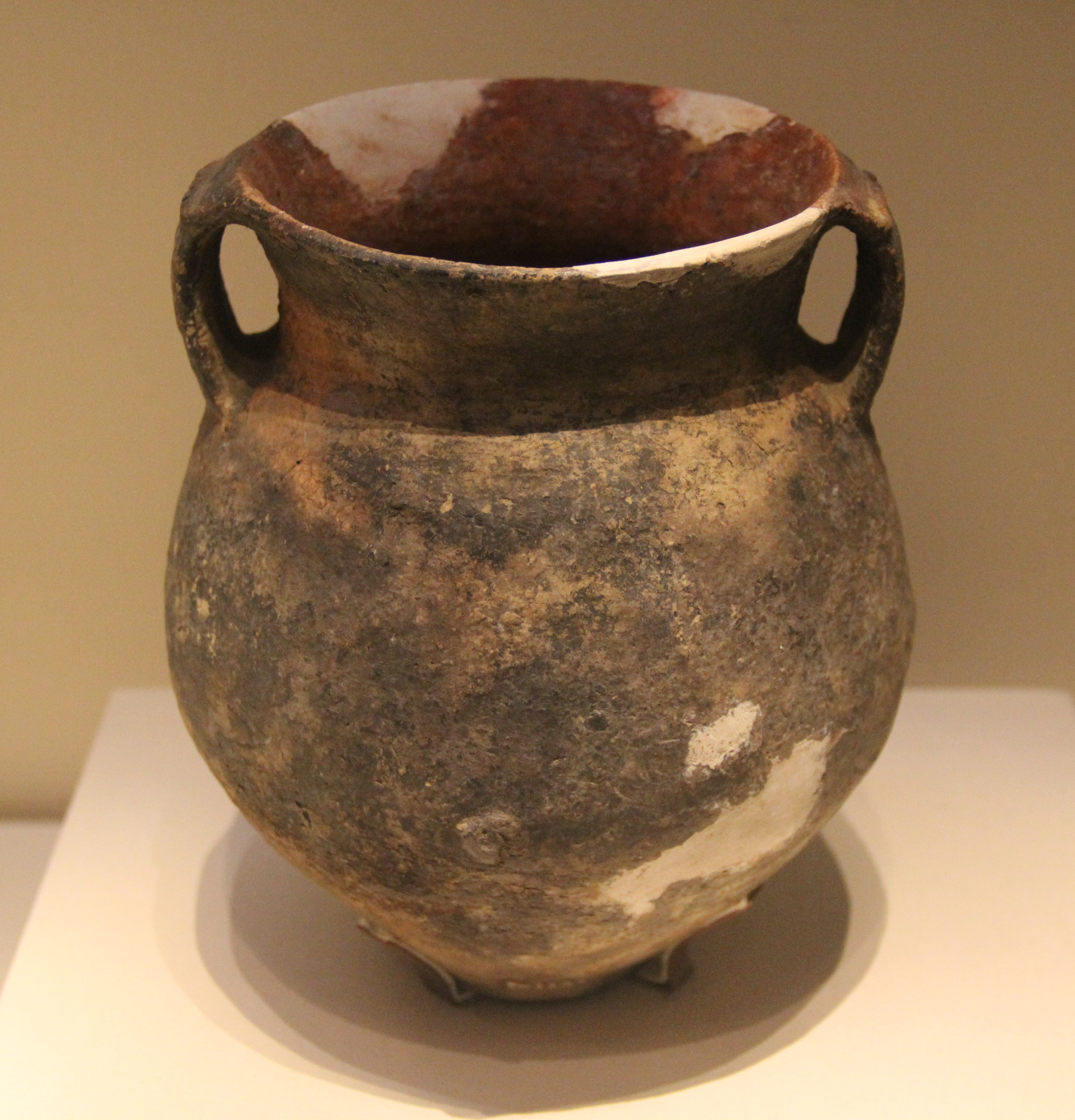
Kayue culture pottery jar

Kayue culture (Chinese: 卡约文化; pinyin: Kǎyuē wénhuà) was a Bronze Age culture in Northwest China in the area of the upper reaches of the Yellow River and its tributary Huang Shui (Tib. Tsong Chu). It was discovered in 1923 in the villages Kayue (卡约) and Xiaxihe (下西河) of Yunguchuan Huangzhong in China's Qinghai Province and is named after the village of Kayue. The former name of the Kayue culture was Kayao culture (Chinese: 卡窑文化; pinyin: Kǎyáo wénhuà), it was previously assigned to the Siwa culture. It is dated to the period of approximately 900 to 600 BCE.

== Geography ==
The Kayue culture was mainly distributed in the territory of the contemporary Minhe, Ledu, Ping'an, Xining, Huzhu, Datong, Haiyan, Gangca (Gangcha), Tongren and Huangzhong counties, where more than 200 sites and over 1,000 graves were found. Among them was the Bronze Age necropolis Suzhi (Suzhi mudi 苏志墓地) in Xunhua Salar Autonomous County.

== Context ==
Kayue culture is believed to have developed from the western part of the Qijia culture.

Among the cultural relics discovered were gold artifacts considered particularly valuable because they reveal facts about gold smelting, production, and use at an early time. They reflect the cultural uniqueness of the ancient Qiang (羌) people, who lived in the northeastern region of Qinghai-Tibet Plateau.

== See also ==
- Dadiwan culture
- Majiayao culture
- Qijia culture
- Siwa culture

== Literature ==
- "Report on the Excavation of the Cemetery of Kayue Culture at Dahuazhongzhuang, Huangyuan County, Qinghai Province by The Qinghai Team of Cultural Relics and Archaeology." Kaogu yu wenwu 1985.05, Shaanxi, 1985 – in Chinese
- "Excavation of Tombs of the Kayue Culture at Banzhuwa, Hualong County, Qinghai by Qinghai Provincial Institute of Cultural Relics and Archaeological and Others." Kaogu 1996.08 – in Chinese
- "Secondary excavation of the Kayue Culture cemetery at Shangbanzhuwa, Hualong county, Qinghai by Qinghai Provincial Institute of Cultural Relics and Archaeology." Kaogu 1998.01, Beijing, 1998 – in Chinese
- "On the Racial Type of the Lijishan People of Kayue Culture in the Light of the Nomeasured Morphological Features of Their Skulls by Zhang Jun." Kaogu 2001.05, Beijing, 2001 – in Chinese
