= Baijinbao culture =

Coordinates: 45.4893°N 124.4565°E

Baijinbao (Chinese: 白金宝 遗址; pinyin: Baijinbao Yizhi) is an archaeological site of the Baijinbao culture (白金宝 文化 Baijinbai Wenhua), a Bronze Age culture in China's northeastern province of Heilongjiang, dated by about 900 BC, the time of the Western Zhou period. The site is located in the village Baijinbao (Ch. 白金宝 屯) on the left bank of the Nen Jiang 嫩江 river near a town Minyi (民意 乡) of the Zhaoyuan county in the Songnen Plain.

The site was discovered in 1974. Baijinbao culture ceramics resembles that of the Zhongyuan area.

Since 1996 the Baijinbao site is on the list of the People's Republic of China's archeological monuments (4-23).

== Literature ==
- Catch 北方 文物 Wenwu 1997.04: An Excavation Report in 1986 of Baijinbao site in Zhaoyuan County, Heilongjiang, by The Relics and Archaeological Research Institute of Heilongjiang and Archaeological Department of Jilin University. Beijing, 1997 (Chinese)
- Nicola Di Cosmo, The Northern Frontier in Pre-Imperial China//The Cambridge History of Ancient China: From the Origins of Civilization to 221 BC, Edited by M.Loewe and E.L.Shaughnessy. ISBN 0-521-47030-7
