= Siwa culture =

Bronze Age culture in China

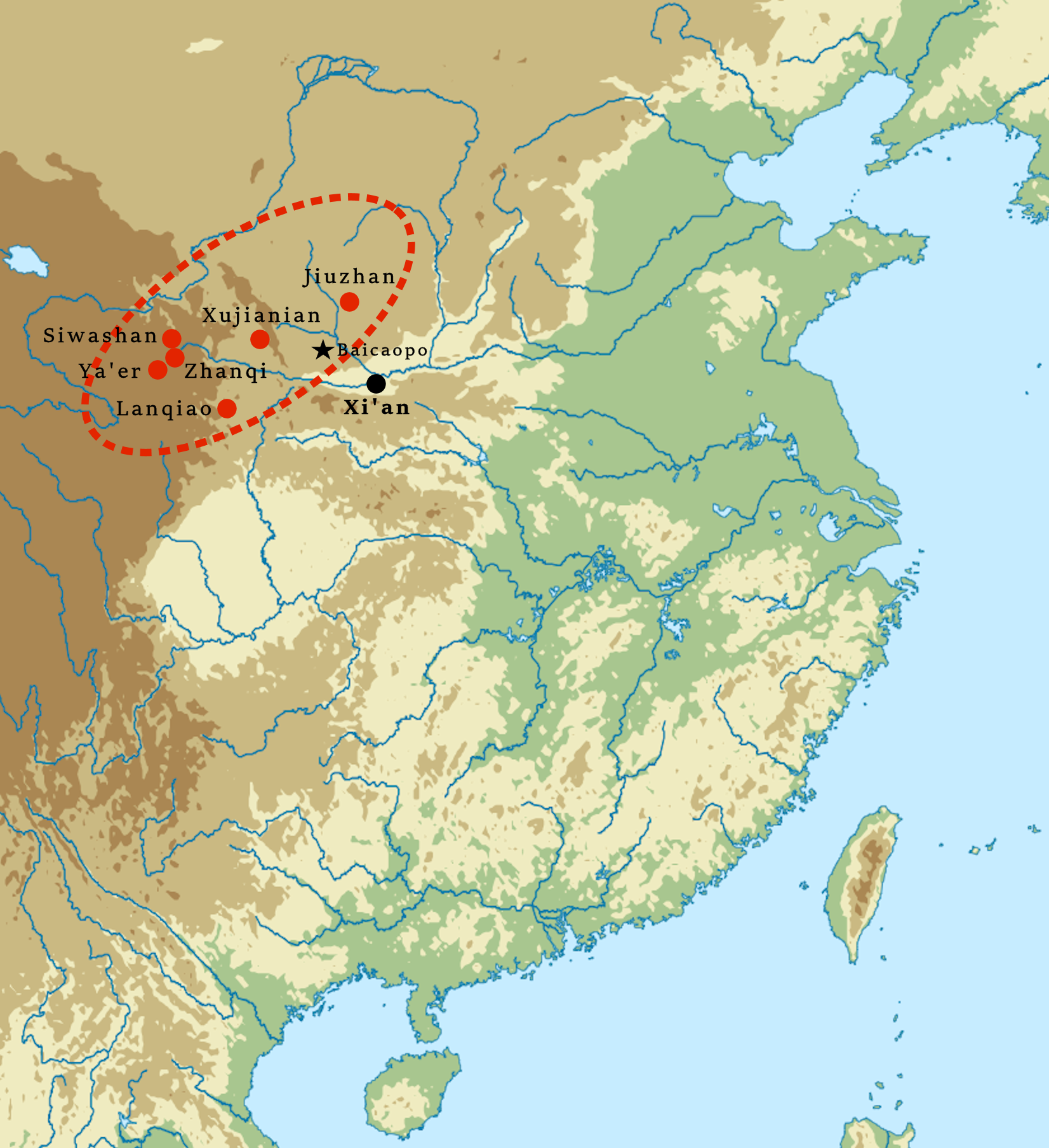
- Area map of the Siwa culture, with main sites: Ya'er, Lanqiao, Xujianian, Jiuzhan... Also shown: the Chinese capital of Xi'an and the Western Zhou frontier outpost of Baicaopo
- Geographical range: upper Yellow River
- Period: Bronze Age
- Dates: c. 1300 – c. 600 BCE
- Preceded by: Majiayao culture Qijia culture
- Followed by: Ordos culture Shajing culture Han dynasty

Chinese name
- Simplified Chinese: 寺洼文化
Transcriptions
Standard Mandarin
- Hanyu Pinyin: Sìwā wénhuà

The Siwa culture (Chinese: 寺洼文化; pinyin: Sìwā wénhuà, ca. 1350-650 BCE) was a Bronze Age culture in southeast Gansu Province, China. It was discovered by Swedish geologist Johan Gunnar Andersson in 1924 at Mount Siwa (寺洼山) in Lintao County, hence its name. It flourished circa 14th to 11th century BC, it is tentatively attributed to the cultures of the Northern Di, Qiang, and Xunyu peoples.

The archaeological culture is divided into two phases: the early phase associated with the sites at Lintao, Zhuoni, Lintan, and Heshui; and, the final phase during the late Shang and proto-Zhou periods associated with the Jiuzhan, Xujianian, and Lanquiao sites. Siwa culture is known for producing a type of pottery that had saddle-shaped mouths.

== Context ==
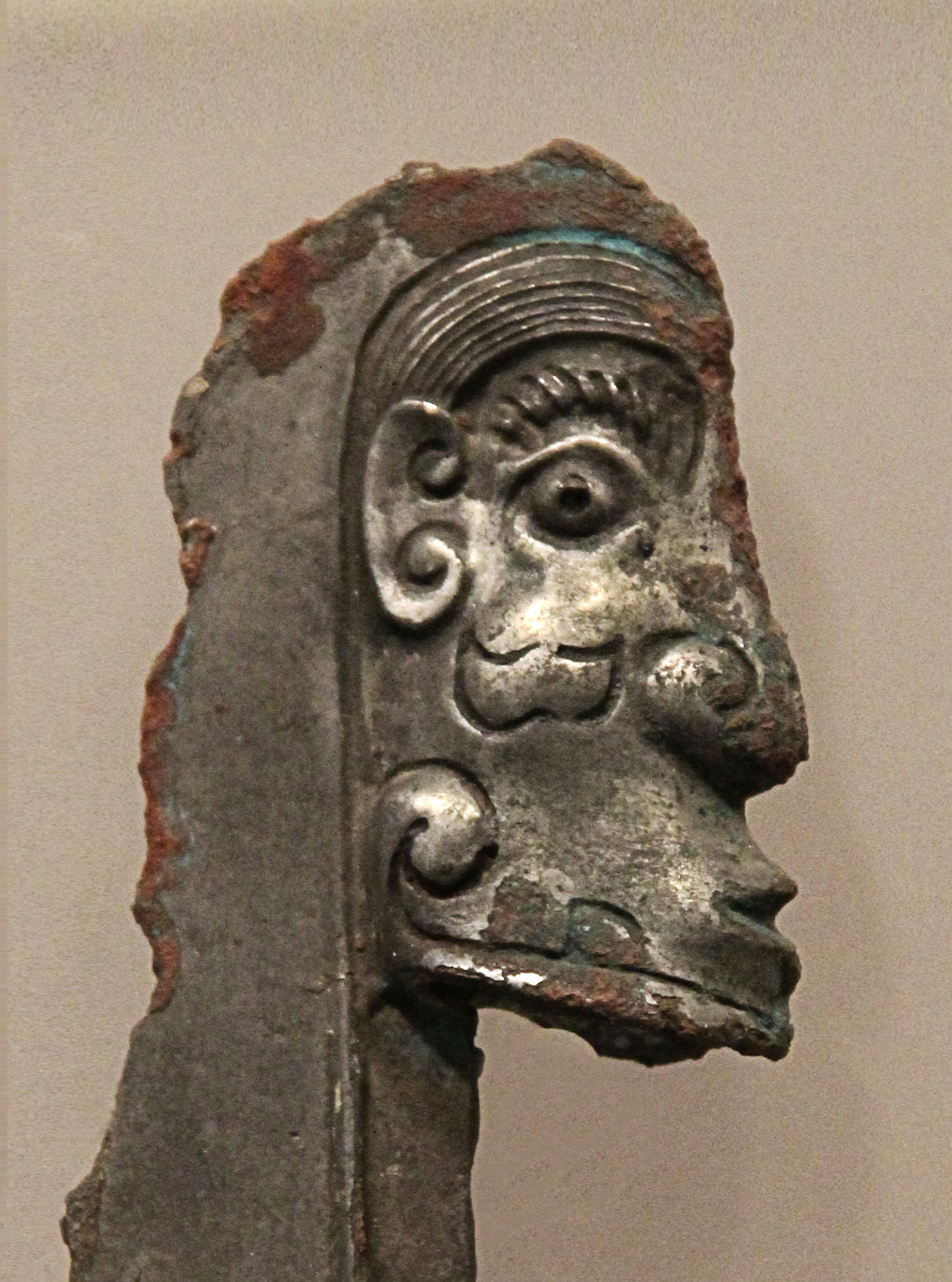
Anthropomorphic design, bronze, excavated in the tomb of Heibo (潶伯), a military noble in charge of protecting the northern frontier, at Baicaopo, Lingtai County, Western Zhou period (1045–771 BCE). Gansu Museum. This is considered as a possible depiction of a Xianyun or Guifang.

The Siwa culture followed the disintegration of the Qijia culture. This opened a period of interaction and conflict between the Siwa and the people of the Central Plains.

The Siwa culture has often been associated with the tribes appearing in Chinese historical sources, such as the Rong (Xirong, Shanrong, Quanrong...) or the Qiang. These tribes, whose captives sometimes were sacrificed in Shang dynasty rituals, ultimately toppled the Western Zhou dynasty in 771 BCE. The Siwa people produced relatively abundant ceramics, reflecting a rather varied diet.

The neighboring Xindian culture was roughly contemporary with the Siwa culture and was influenced by it. Some scholars hold that Siwa culture descended from the Qijia culture. There are also those who believe that the culture was a remnant of Xunyu, which is associated with the Xianyun people. However, questions are raised against this theory since Siwa sites are small with low subsistence levels. According to Feng Li, these could not have sustained an advanced society like the Xianyun. The debate remains open.

The Siwa culture was followed by the appearance of Eurasian steppe cultures, particularly Saka cultures such as the Ordos culture, which again interracted in various ways with the Central Plains.

== Geography ==
Siwa culture is divided into two types – Siwa and Anguo. The former is distributed along the Tao River (Taohe) and the latter along the Wei River. The Siwa type is somewhat earlier than the Western Zhou dynasty, while the Anguo type is more or less contemporaneous with it.

One of Siwa culture's main characteristics is pottery with saddle-shaped openings (马鞍口陶罐), It is also distinguished by its bronze objects.

Since 2006, the Siwa site (寺洼遗址) is on the list of the People's Republic of China's archeological monuments.

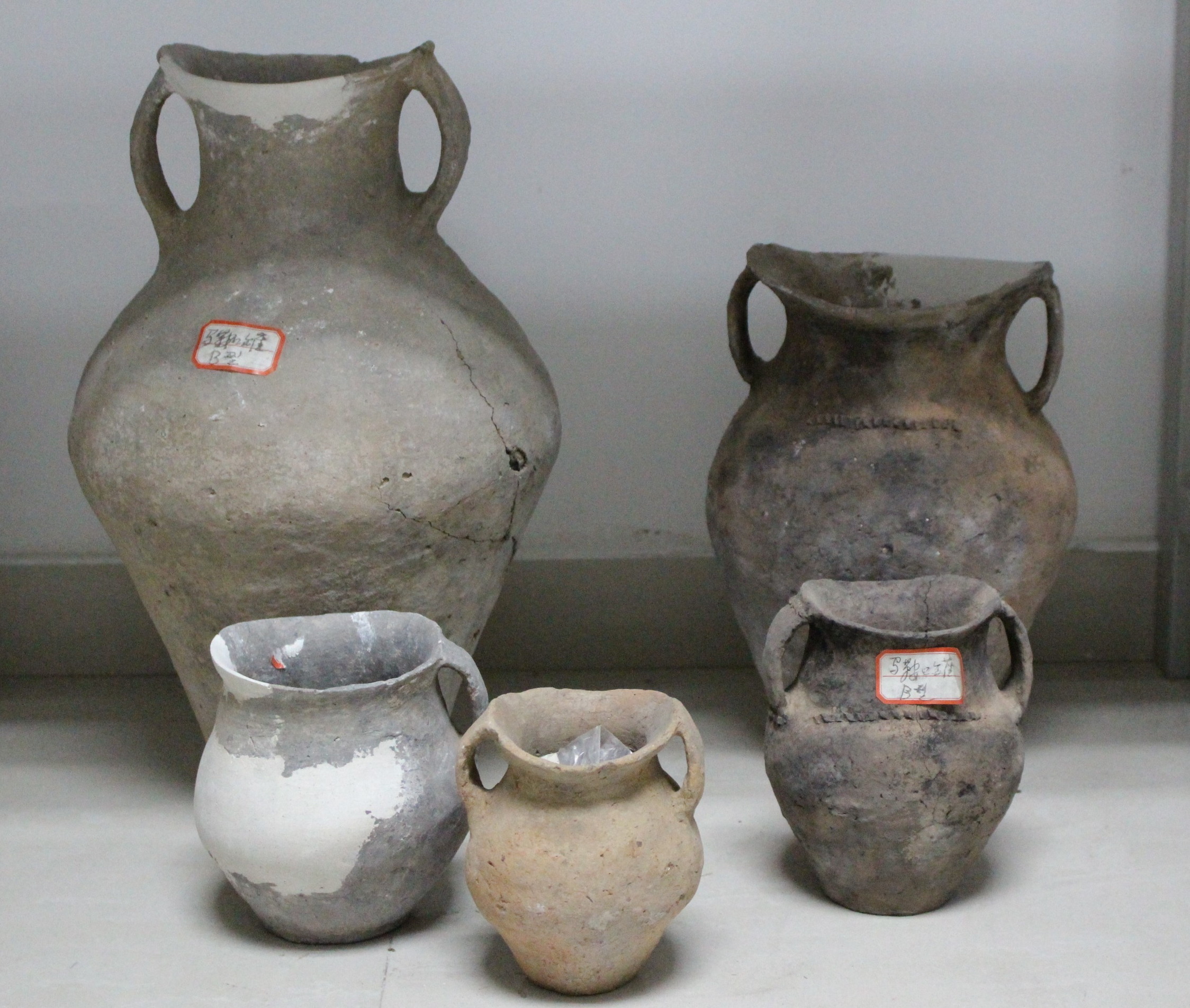
A selection of Ma'an style vessels from the Zhanqi cemetery. Siwa culture

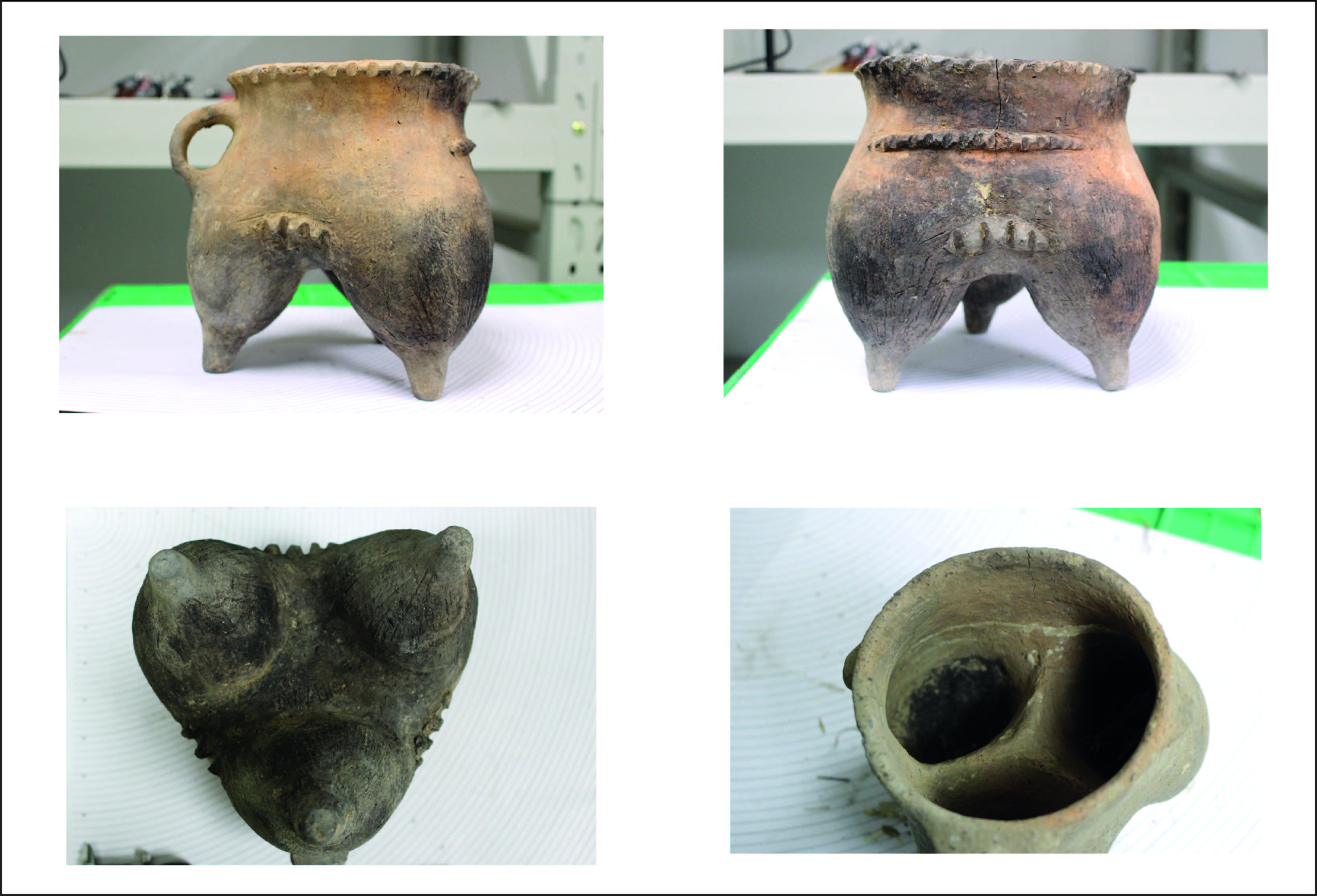
Siwa culture. Use-wear alteration marks of Zhanqi li vessels.

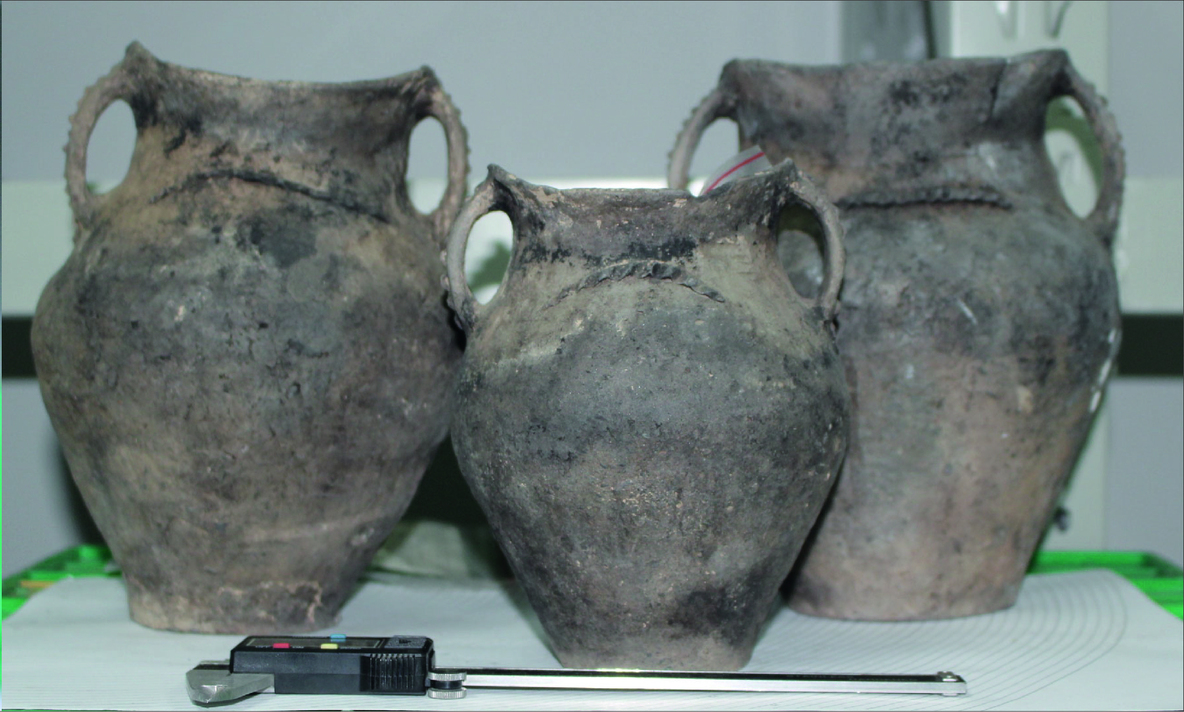
Siwa culture. Ma'an vessels.

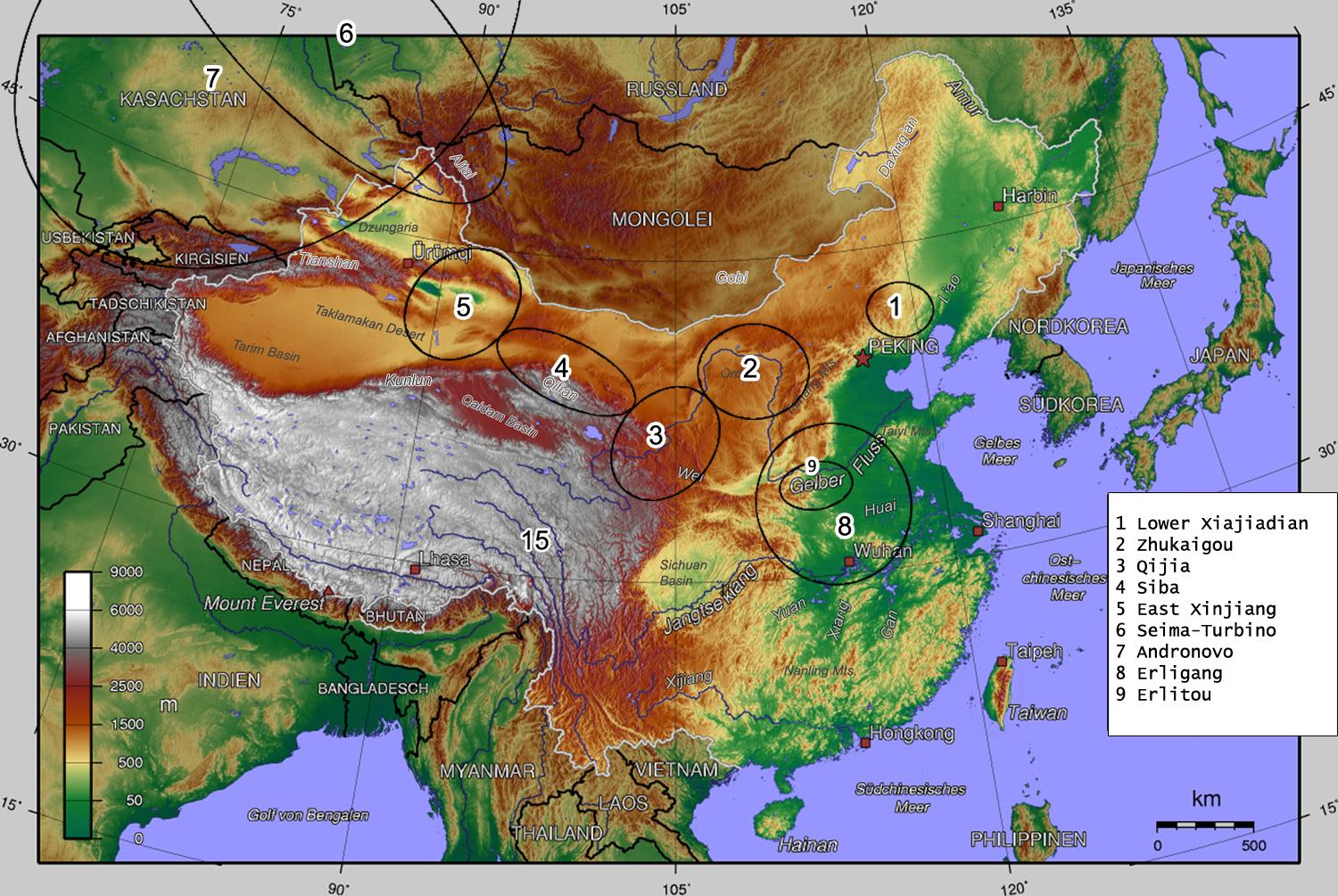
Map of Bronze Age China; the Siwa culture area is similar to the Qijia culture (#3)
