= Qijia culture =

Bronze Age culture around the upper Yellow River region

- Geographical range: upper Yellow River
- Period: early Bronze Age
- Dates: c. 2400 – c. 1600 BC
- Preceded by: Majiayao culture
- Followed by: Siwa culture Siba culture Xindian culture Shanma culture

Chinese name
- Traditional Chinese: 齊家文化
- Simplified Chinese: 齐家文化
Transcriptions
Standard Mandarin
- Hanyu Pinyin: Qíjiā wénhuà

The Qijia culture (2400 BC – 1600 BC) was an early Bronze Age culture distributed around the upper Yellow River region of Gansu (centered in Lanzhou) and eastern Qinghai, China. It is regarded as one of the earliest bronze cultures in China.

The Qijia Culture is named after the Qijiaping Site (齐家坪) in Gansu Province.

Prior to Qijia culture, in the same area there existed Majiayao culture that was also familiar with metalwork. At the end of the third millennium B.C., Qijia culture succeeded Majiayao culture at sites in three main geographic zones: Eastern Gansu, Middle Gansu, and Western Gansu/Eastern Qinghai.

The Qijia culture benefited from the warm and humid climatic conditions from the Late Glacial to the Middle Holocene, which led to flourishing agricultural production and rapid population growth. These conditions changed with the aridification of the Late Holocene, provoking material and cultural decline.

== Research ==
Qijia culture and contemporary cultures c. 2000 BCE

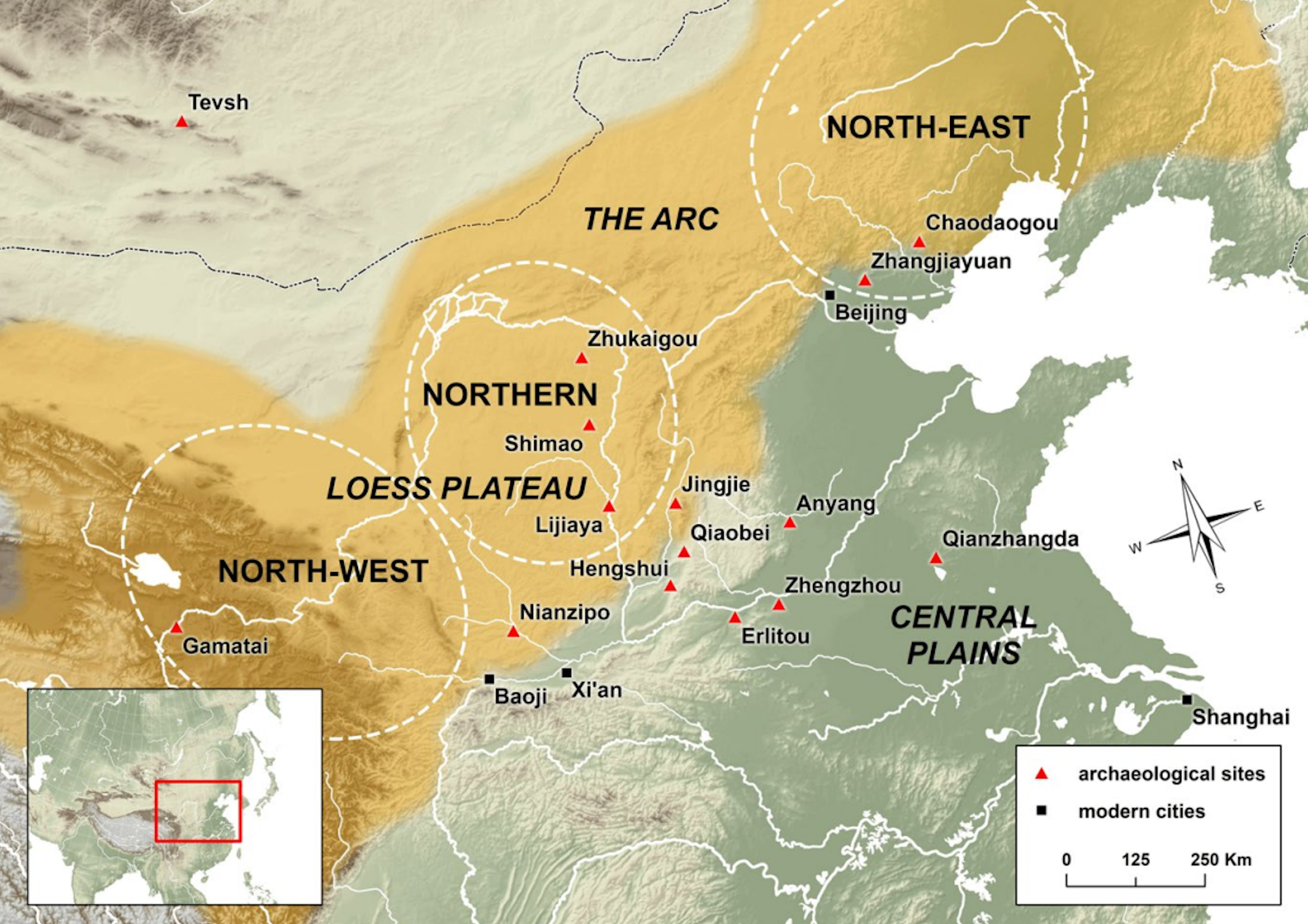
The Qijia culture was part of the "Arc of the eastern Steppe", next to the Central Plain of China.

Johan Gunnar Andersson discovered the initial site at Qijiaping (齊家坪) in 1923. Qijia culture was a sedentary culture, based on agriculture, and breeding pigs, which were also used in sacrifices.

Qijia culture is distinguished by a presence of numerous domesticated horses, and practice of oracle divination, the metal knives and axes recovered apparently point to some interactions with Siberian and Central Asian cultures, in particular with the Seima-Turbino complex, or the Afanasievo culture. Archeological evidence points to plausible early contact between the Qijia culture and Central Asia. The cultures of West Asia and Central Asia spread eastward as early as the late Neolithic period and the early Bronze age, when bronze technology, pottery and ornamation styles were introduced to the early cultures of China, such as the Siba culture (about 2000-1600 BCE), the Qijia culture (2500-1500 BCE), the Chawuhugoukou culture (around 800-100 BCE) or the Subeshi culture (1100-100 BCE).

The archaeological sites at Lajia, Huangniangniangtai, Qinweijia, and Dahezhuang are associated with the Qijia culture. Qijia sites were also found in Ningxia and Inner Mongolia Autonomous regions.

A total of over 350 sites of the Qijia culture have been found superimposed on the Majiayao culture. A large quantity of metal ware, mostly copper objects, including some bronzes, have been excavated from various sites in Gansu province and at Gamatai in Qinghai province.

25 pieces of metalwork were analyzed for their composition. Those made from copper were the most numerous, accounting for 64 per cent of the total. The rest represented various copper alloys, including tin. Contacts between the Afanasievo culture and the Majiayao culture and the Qijia culture have been considered for the transmission of bronze technology. During this period, Central Asian styles of pottery and ornamentation, in addition to bronze techniques, were also introduced to the Qijia Culture and the Siba culture. In particular, bronze knife technology was probably transferred from the Seima-Turbino phenomenon through the Southern Siberian Munkhkhairkhan culture to various Chinese cultures, such as the Qijia culture, Erlitou culture or Lower Xiajiadian culture, where very similar knives have been found.

Qijia culture produced some of the earliest bronze and copper mirrors found in China. Extensive domestication of horses was found at many Qijia sites.

Many of the artifacts of the Qijia culture are thought to have derived from the Seima-Turbino culture of the Altai Mountains area.

In 2000, archeologists found a subterranean pit with bodies from victims of an earthquake. In the cave nicknamed "F4", the bodies of multiple children and some adults were found together with a pottery bowl containing the earliest register of noodles from China. The noodles was made of flour and wheat, and the pottery was dated from 4000 BP, the last phase of the Qijia culture.

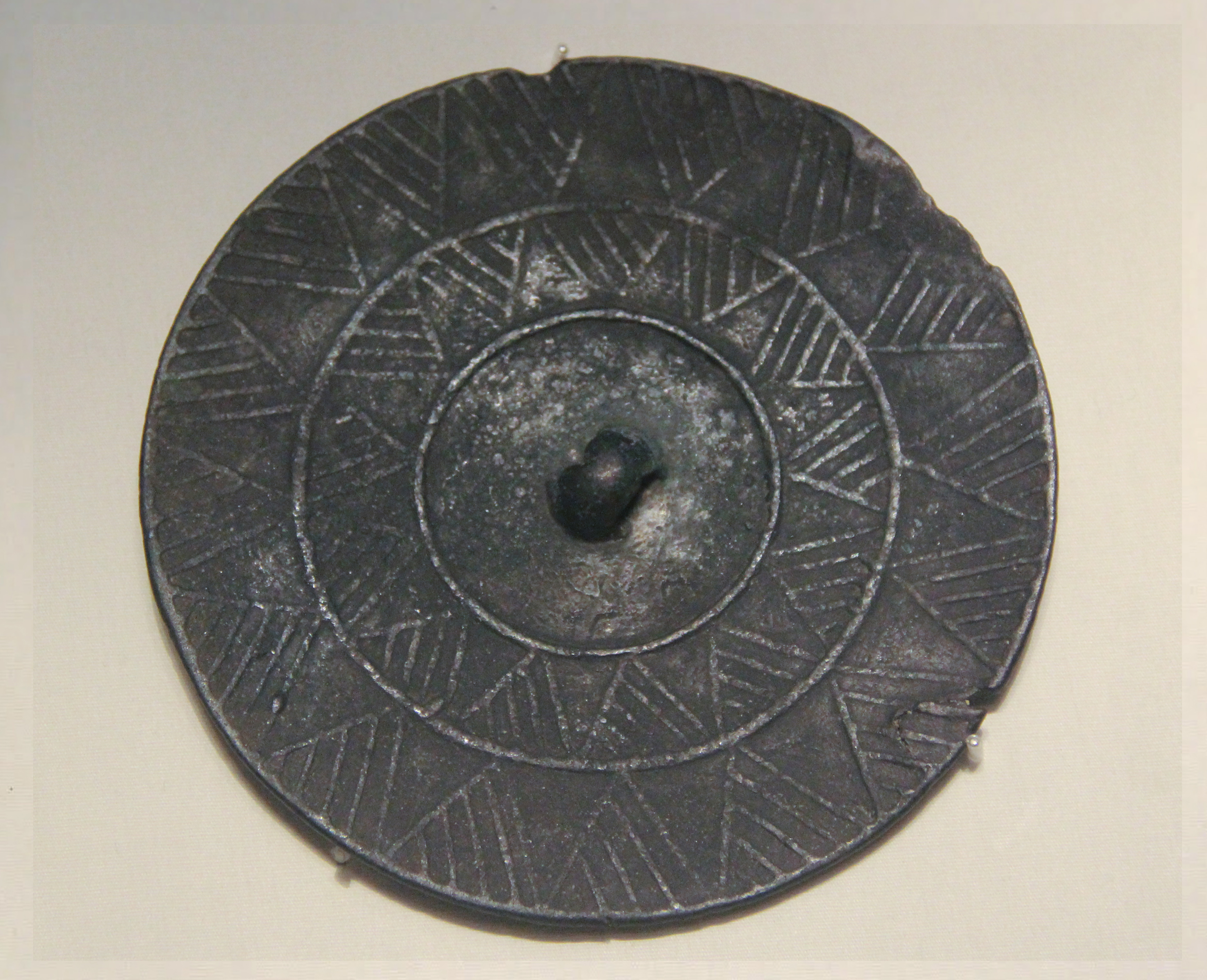
Bronze mirror, Gansu. Qijia culture (2400–1900) National Museum of China.

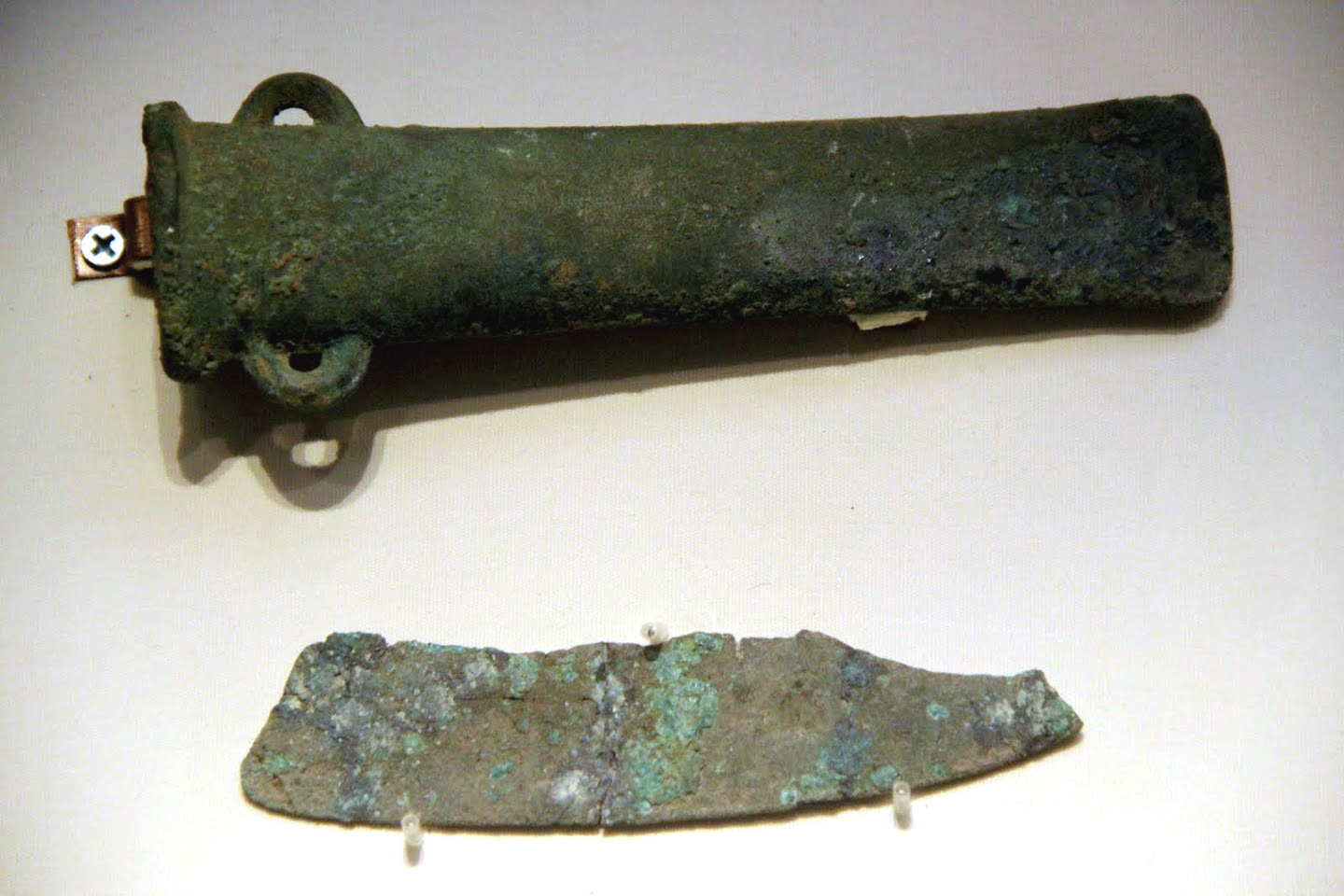
Bronze axe and copper knife, Qijia Culture, Gansu. Probably derived from the Seima-Turbino culture.

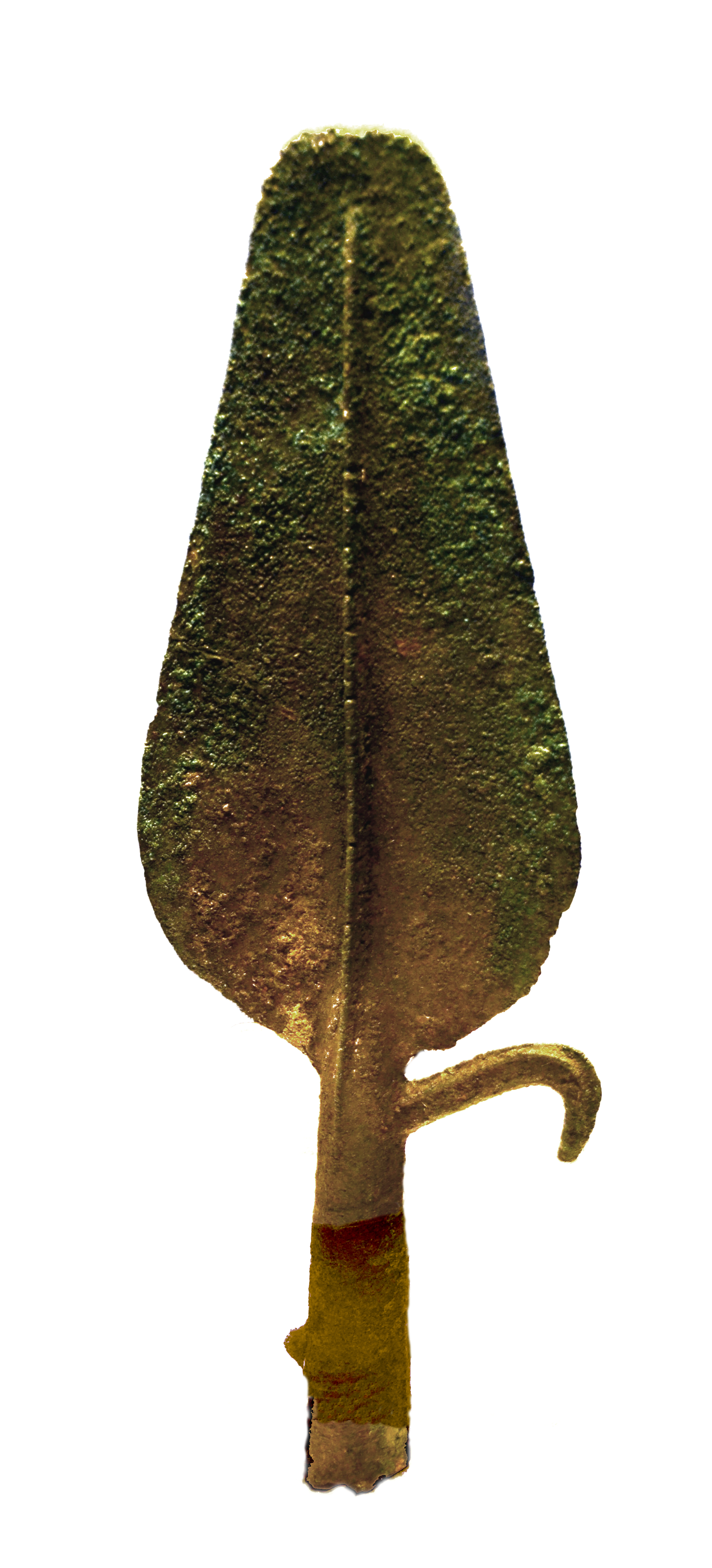
Hooked bronze spear of Seima-Turbino type. Unearthed at Shenna, site of Xining. Qijia Culture (2000 BC)

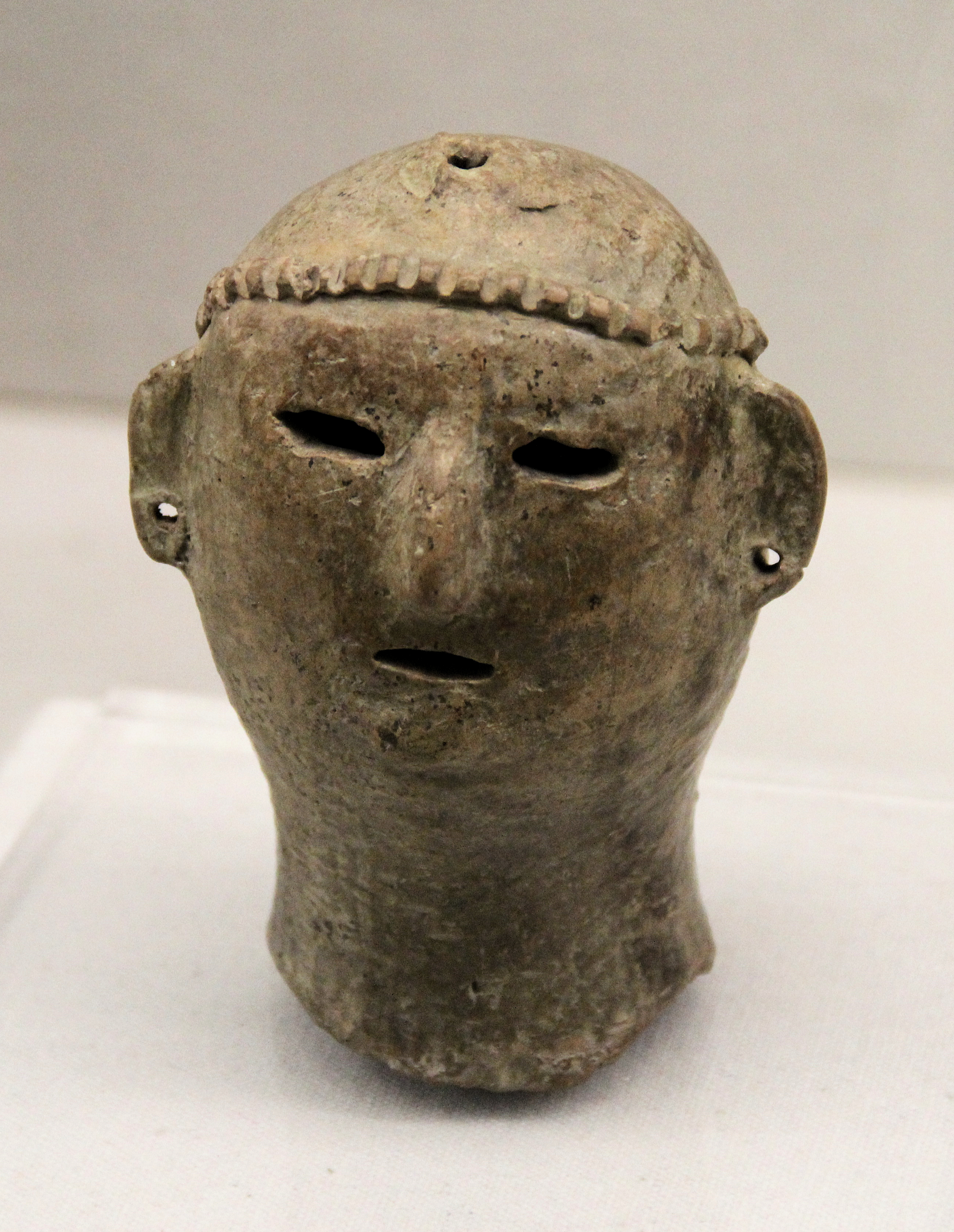
Qijia culture pottery head.

=== Pottery ===
Techniques of pottery-making are marked by a fine red ware and a coarse reddish-brown ware. There are also a few pieces of grey ware. They are handmade, there being no evidence of wheel-made ware. While the Qijia culture pottery has its own stylistic characteristics, it also shares many traits in common with the Longshan culture in Shaanxi. Some elements of the Majiayao culture are also present.

== Machang culture ==
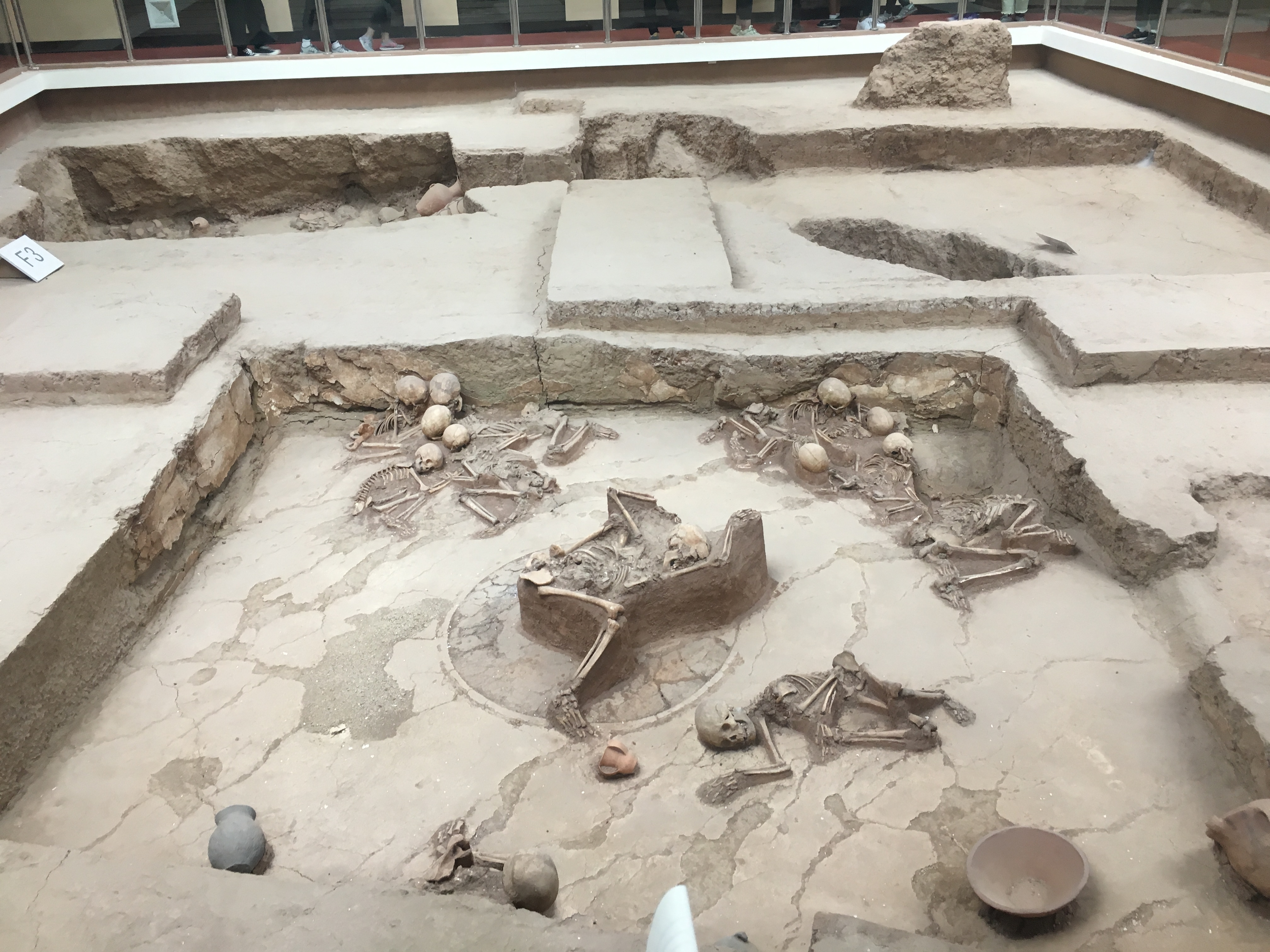
Ruins of Lajia.

Machang culture (马厂) also flourished in 2500–2000 BC along the Yellow River; it was an outgrowth of the Banshan culture. Machang culture was partly contemporary with the Qijia; although they were quite different, there was cultural exchange between them. Some scholars consider Machang culture as only a phase of the larger Majiayao culture, with the Qijia being derived from the Machang.

== Mogou site ==
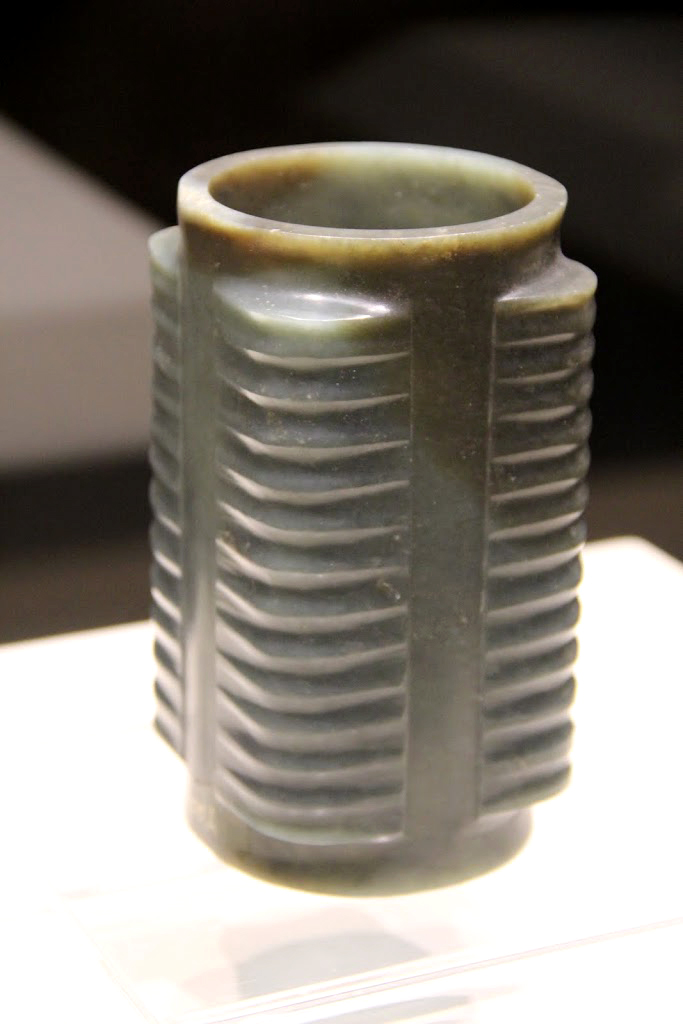
Jade cong, Qijia Culture, 2100-1700 BC.

The Qijia Culture Cemetery at Mogou in Lintan County, Gansu was excavated beginning from 2008. More than one thousand graves have been found there. The area was inhabited during the first half of the second millennium BCE. Thousands of funerary goods have been found, such as pottery vessels, bone ornaments and implements, shells, and metal objects. The graves at Mogou revealed a high level of violence in the Qijia culture. Human sacrifice in the Qijia culture have also been documented.

To date, this represents by far the biggest find of copper and bronze objects ascribed to the Qijia culture, as more than three hundred items were found here. The finds are mostly implements, such as knives, and ornaments, such as buttons, earrings and beads. Some types of objects, such as torques and armbands, were not found before.

Examination reveals that tin bronze (Cu-Sn) was the most important alloy used at the Mogou site. Other alloys, such as Cu-Sn-Pb (lead) and Cu-Sn-As (arsenic), were also in use. Some items were manufactured by casting and hot-forging.

Two iron fragments were recently excavated at the Mogou cemetery. They have been dated to the 14th century BC. One of the fragments was made of bloomery iron rather than meteoritic iron.

== Late stages ==
During the late stages of the culture, the Qijia culture retreated from the west and suffered a reduction in population size. Some scholars hold that Siwa culture was a descendant of the Qijia culture. Also, Kayue culture is believed by some to have developed from the western part of the Qijia culture.

== Genetics ==
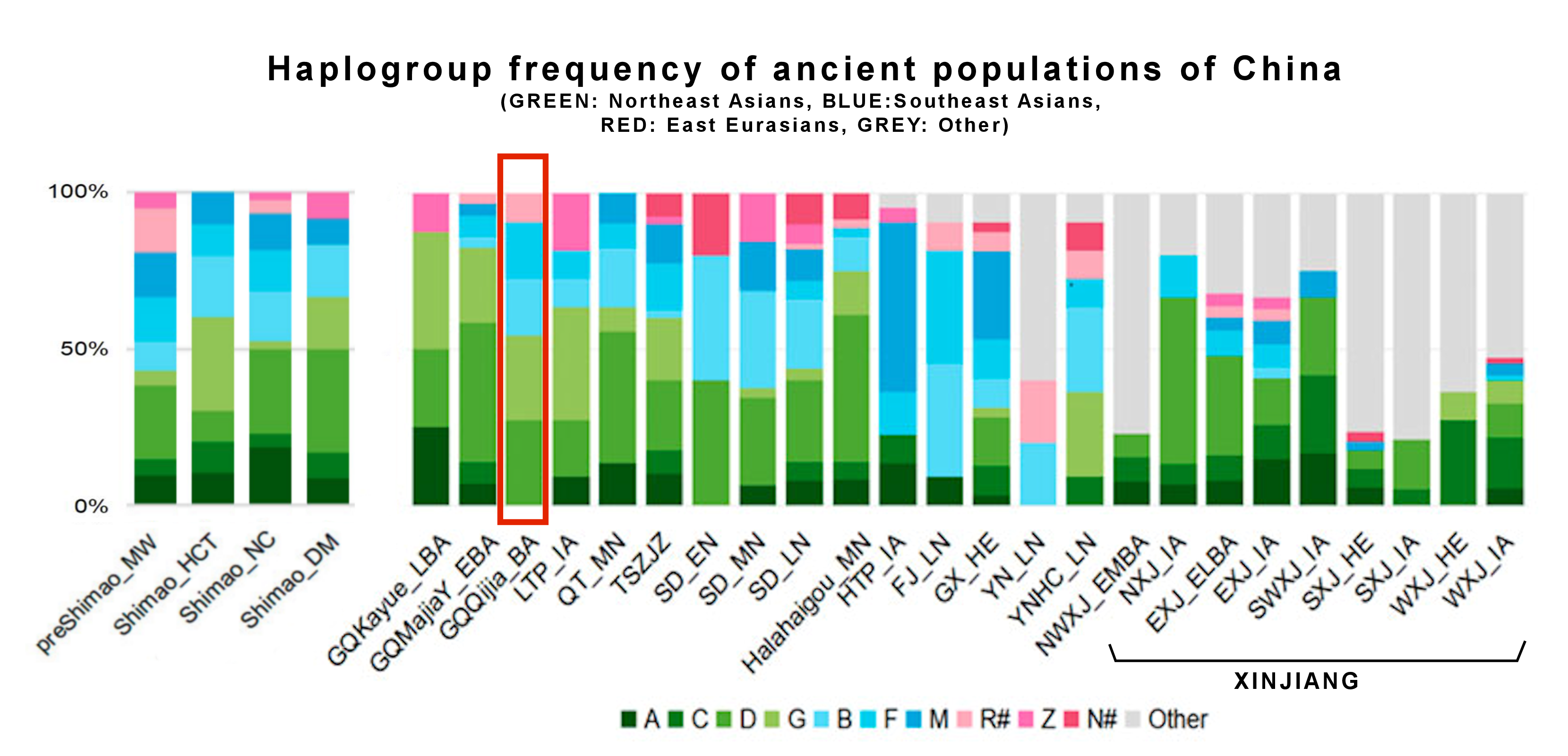
Haplogroup frequency of ancient populations of China (with Qijia culture).

Genetic analyses of ancient remains associated with the Qijia and Mogou sites were found to display high genetic affinity with modern Sino-Tibetan-speaking peoples, particularly modern Qiang people and Han Chinese, as well as with ancient 'Yellow River farmers' associated with the Yangshao culture. Mogou remains belonged exclusively to paternal haplogroup O-M175 (O3a). The Qijia culture people were 80% Yellow river neolithic farmer and 20% Amur hunter gatherer.

A mix of 34-36% Ancient Northeast Asian and 64-66% Yellow River neolithic farmer were the results of the Di-Qiang people in eastern Hexi Corridor (Gansu) who were related to the Qijia culture during the Neolithic.

== See also ==
- History of metallurgy in China
- Dadiwan culture
- Majiayao culture
- Yangshao culture
- Xishanping
