= Elunin culture =

Bronze Age culture in Asia

- Geographical range: Western Siberia
- Period: Bronze Age
- Dates: c. 2300 BC – c. 1700 BC
- Preceded by: Bolshemys culture
- Followed by: Krotov culture

Location of the Elunin culture, with the Elunin cemetery and other contemporary cultures c. 2000 BCE

The Elunin culture or Elunino culture (Russian: Eлунинская культура) is an indigenous Bronze Age culture of animal breeders in the steppe and forest-steppe area of the Ob-Irtysh rivers of Ural foothill-plain zone in Siberia, developed from the local Bolshemys Eneolithic culture, dated around 2300–1700 BCE.

The monuments of this early and advanced bronze-producing culture number more than 50 settlements and cemeteries. Burial complexes include ground (non-kurgan) burial sites of Elunin, Staroaley, Tsygan Sopka, Wolf Cape, etc. The culture was named after the Elunin cemetery. The Elunin culture was discovered and described by Yu. F. Kiryushin in 1986.

The tribes of the Elunin culture, along with the Krotov and Loginov cultures, were involved in formation of the Seima-Turbinsky transcultural phenomenon of numerous bronze tools and weapons, and highly developed casting technology.

Funerary monuments and settlements of the Elunin culture are known to include tools and weapons of the Seima-Turbinsky types, including knives, celts, spearheads, and molds for casting celts and spearheads.

== Anthropological composition ==
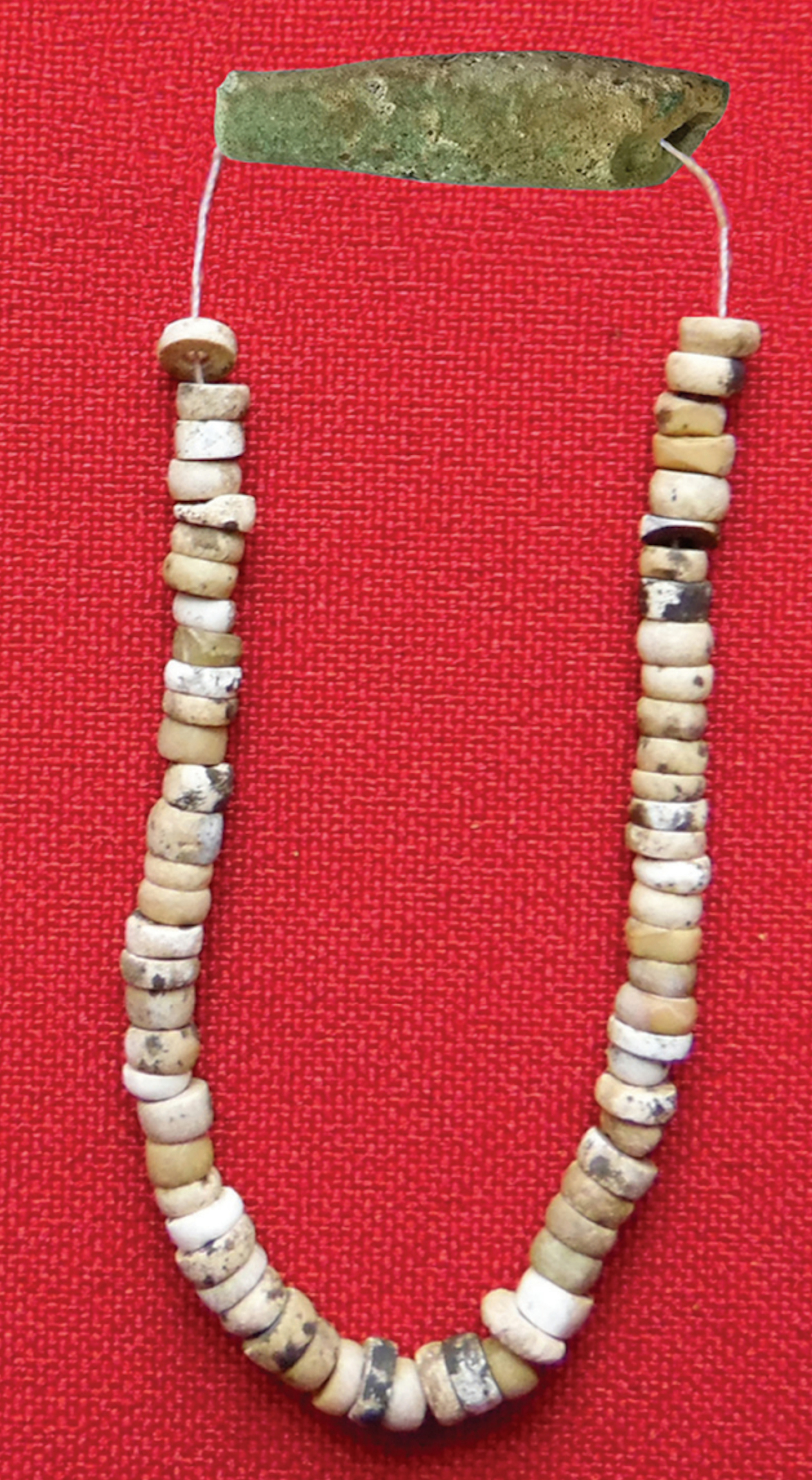
Elunino culture bracelet from the grave No.16 of the burial ground Teleutskyi Vzvoz-I, 22nd–18th centuries BCE.

The Elunin culture is well-studied, its dating is supported by radiocarbon measurements, the metal production tested and analyzed, animal bones investigated, and produced genetic studies. The culture was formed by interaction of migrants, who brought with them tradition of bronze metallurgy and advanced animal husbandry, with the local mix of Caucasoid-Mongoloid substrate. According to A. Tishkin, who excavated Elunin monuments, molecular testing points to interaction between migrant Caucasoid ethnic groups and indigenous Mongoloid-Caucasoid mixed populations in the foothills and plains area of the Altai's Upper Ob at the end of the 3rd millennium BCE.

In general, the migration wave of Andronovo cultural-historical community tribes pushed inhabitants of the Altai-Sayan foothills to the north toward the southern taiga zone, where their physical type (anthropologically ascended to the Southern Eurasian Anthropological Formation) conflated with local tribes (anthropologically ascended to the Northern Eurasian Anthropological Formation) and went on ethnogenesis of the Andronoid cultures. The phenotype features of Elunin people are distinctive. The Elunin culture developed from the local Bolshemys Eneolithic culture. In its formation participated a Caucasoid population of Eastern Mediterranean type, migrants from Central Asia. The migration started in the Eneolithic period and continued in the early and advanced bronze periods. Another ethnic component was associated with the East, and possibly northern Kazakhstan, they were people with ceramic comb-patch ornamentation, traceable to the nearest early Andronovo tribes of East Kazakhstan. Penetration starts in the final stages of the Elunin culture, and coincides with the area of Bolshemys settlements. The northern boundary of the penetration lies in the Novosibirsk Oblast.

== Economy ==
The mainstay of the Elunin economy was extensive animal husbandry, illustrated by tens of thousands bones and bone fragments found in a single settlement. The composition of the herds was 60% sheep, 25% horses, and 15% cattle.

== Bibliography ==
- Degtyarev A.D.; et al. (2010). Metalwork of Elunin Culture Population of Upper Ob (PDF) (in Russian). Vol. 2. Journal of Archaeology, Anthropology and Ethnography. p. 27 onwards. Archived from the original (PDF) on 6 October 2014.
- Grushin S.P. (2011). Pottery Industry of Elunino Culture Population in the Early Bronze Age in the Territory of Upper Ob Region (PDF) (in Russian). Vol. 4. News of Altai State University.
- Chikisheva T.A. (2010). "Conclusions". Dynamics of anthropological differentiation in population of southern Western Siberia in Neolithic - Early Iron Age (in Russian). Novosibirsk. "Professorial dissertation"
