= Bolshemys culture =

Location of the Bolshemys culture, with Bolshoi Mys site and other contemporary cultures c. 3000 BCE.

Bolshemys culture (Russian: Большемысская культура) is an Eneolithic culture (4000–3000 BC) of foot hunters in the Altai mountains in the region amid the rivers Katun, Biya, Irtysh and Ob in South Siberia. Eneolithic monuments of the steppe Altai were discovered in the foothill zone in the 1970s by B.H. Kadikov, but for a time they remained unrecognized and were classed as Neolithic. The culture has about 50 known monuments with Eneolithic material. Only one cemetery, Large Cape (Bolshoi Mys in Russian), is known so far, and the culture was named for it.

The culture is noted for its ceramic vessels with tipped or beet-shaped bottom, thin-walled and thoroughly dressed, later supplanted by more thick-walled round- and flattened-bottom. Vessel ornamentation is dominated by jagged and smooth lines, and comb pattern, sometimes with grid, triangle, and zig-zag decorations. The ornamentation technique is close to that of the Kelteminar monuments of Central Asia and the Afanasevo culture of Altai. In rare cases, vessels have print-comb ornamentation, more typical to the Chalcolithic art of the Eastern Urals and Tumen-Ob region. Thick-walled vessels are sometimes covered with textile patterns, rows of pearls, and rarely pits. The discovery of a metal awl in the remains of a house allowed confident attribution of the Bolshemys complexes to the Eneolithic Age. In the Eneolithic layers, the number of bifaces, arrowheads, and large plates is five to ten times greater compared to the Neolithic layers. Bolshemys people lived in light surface dwellings.

Appearance of the Bolshemys monuments in the Middle Katun area is thought to be associated with migration, which caused a complete change of the previous local population, seen in change of ornamental traditions, forms of pottery, and stone tools.

The Bolshemys foot hunter economy engaged in hunting of hoofed animals—roe deer, musk deer, red deer, and Siberian ibex, and mouflon. The population was well adapted to the natural conditions. Settlement location at the junction of highlands and midlands allowed for sustainable agriculture and sufficiently permanent produce.

Scientists hold that the Kelteminar culture is related to Pit–Comb Ware culture and belonged to a Finno-Ugric people. However, the archaeological detection in southern Western Siberia of the Neolithic population south-western connections with Bolshemys and Kelteminar cultures is not corroborated by anthropological studies as a migration impulse, and can be explained by the existence in a distant past of common anthropological genetic substrate of the population, which probably preserved intercultural contacts between the offspring cultures. In the Early Metal Period (c. 2000 BC – 300 AD) in the southern region of the Western Siberia two core anthropological communities survived, which formed the fabric for the morphological traits of the Early Metal Period population. T.A. Chikisheva defines them anthropologically as Northern Eurasian Anthropological Formation (Uralic type) and Southern Eurasian Anthropological Formation (Altaic type). Studies found anthropological continuity between the people of the Neolithic and Ust-Tartas cultures in the Baraba steppe. Evidence indicates an influx of Bolshemys culture from the Barnaul-Biysk-Ob area or their descendants into the anthropological milieu of Ust-Tartas culture of the Baraba province. The obvious migratory impulses of animal husbandry population from the Middle East or Middle Asia from the south to the territory of the Altai Mountains are traced by the anthropological markers starting after 2000 BC, and increasing in the Early Nomads Era (2000–1 BC). In the Early Bronze Age (3200–2300 BC), the population of the Baraba steppe retained capacity of the indigenous anthropological substrate, having assimilated the migrant Bolshemys Culture. The Ust-Tartas Culture, in turn, was replaced by the anthropological complex of the Odinov culture, and later by Krotov culture, with the anthropological composition of the population containing only autochthonous morphological complex.
