= Odino culture =

- Geographical range: Western Siberia
- Period: Bronze Age
- Dates: c. 2900 BC – c. 1900
- Followed by: Krotov culture

The Odino culture is an archeological culture of foot hunters in the basin of the upper Ob river. The culture includes two phases, the older from 2900–2500 BC, the younger from 2300–1900 BC. The Odino culture covers an island surrounded by forest-steppe type cultural array. Its settlements are situated along the terraces of the rivers and creeks. Certain insufficiently understood dwellings appear to be dug-outs. It is thought that the Odino culture rose from Eneolithic forest- steppe cultures in the Ishim area.

== Economy ==
The available materials indicate the beginning of a tradition of an economy based on animal husbandry. Osteological material is represented exclusively by domesticated animals' bones indicating the central role of animal husbandry to the Odino economy. Similarity with typical products of tin bronze alloys indicate affiliation with the Seima-Turbino phenomenon. The Odino culture stone industry has not been fully studied.

== Archeology ==
Odino culture burials are similar to those of the Krotovo culture, which indicate the presence of common rituals typical for the cultures of the northern forest-steppe belonging to the Seima Turbino metallurgical province.

The Odino culture is notable for its ceramics, with dishes decorated with comb impressions with or without rows of pit indentations, coarse textile prints, and some pit ornament elements forming geometrical figures. Odino culture is marked by specific borrowings in ornamentation, including pseudo-textile prints, which indicates close ties with the taiga populations.

== Literature ==
- Молодин. В. И. др. Радиоуглеродная хронология култур эпохи Бронзы. [RADIOCARBON CHRONOLOGY OF THE SOUTH URALS AND THE SOUTH OF THE WESTERN SIBERIA CULTURES (2000–2013-YEARS INVESTIGATIONS): PRINCIPLES AND APPROACHES, ACHIEVEMENTS AND PROBLEMS]. УДК 902.652 (2014). ISSN 1818-7919.
- Volkov E.N. (2004) "Odinov Bronze Age culture"//Great Tumen encyclopedia. Tyumen, Tyumen University Press, Vol. 2, p. 384 (In Russian)
- Kosarev M.F., "Bronze Age in Western Siberia", Moscow, 1981 (In Russian)
- Chlenova N.L., Dating of Irmen culture//Chronology and cultural affiliation problems of archaeological sites in Western Siberia, Tomsk, 1970, pp. 133–149 (In Russian)
- Chikisheva T.A., Dynamics of anthropological differentiation in population of southern Western Siberia in Neolithic - Early Iron Age, Professorial dissertation, Novosibirsk, 2010, section Conclusions http://www.dissercat.com/content/dinamika-antropologicheskoi-differentsiatsii-naseleniya-yuga-zapadnoi-sibiri-v-epokhi-neolit (In Russian)
