= Krotov culture =

Coordinates: 53°32′N 82°27′E

- Geographical range: Western Siberia
- Period: Bronze Age
- Dates: c. 2000 BC – c. 1200 BC
- Preceded by: Elunin culture Odino culture Ust-Tarta culture
- Followed by: Andronovo culture Pachomovo culture

Novosibirsk area

The Krotov culture (often Krotovo culture, c. 2000-1200 BCE) was an indigenous culture of animal breeders in the steppe and forest-steppe area of the Western Siberia Altai mountainous area of Russia in the upper Irtysh river basin. The Krotov culture embraces the period from the turn of the 3rd and 2nd millenniums to the 13th to 12th centuries BCE. It is a first (pre-Andronovan) period of developed bronze in the Western Siberia. The Krotov culture is an areal period named for a circle of cultures that include Elunin culture, Krotov culture, Loginov culture and similar cultures with identical or close traits and variations. Krotov culture people engaged in cattle breeding, hunting and fishing. In the territory of the culture were found stone and bronze tools.

Some scientists attribute the materials of the Tashkov culture to the Krotov culture people (Kovalev, Chairkina, 1991), with a corollary that Tashkov culture people also had an animal husbandry economy with short-distance grazing. The Tashkov culture people were in regular cultural contact with the population of the Southern Urals, and they also learned metalworking.

== Seima-Turbino Metallurgical Province phenomenon ==
Krotov culture, along with Elunin, Loginov and similar cultures constituted one component of the Seima-Turbino Phenomenon. The tribes of the Krotov circle cultures were located in the Altai area steppes, forest-steppes and foothills; they were metallurgists and pastoral animal breeders. They developed entirely new designs of socketed weapons, and art images that included horses, oxen, sheep, camels, and more. The other component was located in the area of the Sayan highlands, where lived populations of the southern zone of East Siberian taiga hunters and fishermen. They belonged to the Glazkov, Shiver, and other cultures around the Baikal and Angara River basin, who mastered bronze casting and the manufacture of flint, jade and bone implements, and produced twin blade knives, scraper knives, and saws; their imagery had snakes, elk, bear, and more. The organic fusion of the Altai and Sayan components into a single culture is thought to have occurred in the steppe foothills between the Ob and Irtysh rivers.

The tribes of the Krotov and related cultures migrated rapidly first to Western Siberia, and then by northern routes to the Urals and Eastern Europe, to the Kama and Oka rivers and along the Volga to its lower course; in the north they spread to the basin of the Pechora and Vychegda rivers, and on to the northern regions of Finland.

Migrations of the Krotov circle culture tribes are traced by typological artifacts found in burials and settlements, the weaponry of knives, celts, spearheads, the casting molds for forked spearheads, and Krotov ceramics, distinct from the artifacts of the local cultures.

== Economy ==
In the Bronze Age, Altai populations transitioned from hunter-gathering to a productive economy: from hunting, plant-gathering and fishing to livestock-breeding and agriculture. The early Altaians in the summer grazed herds of cows, horses, and flocks of sheep and goats on alpine meadows; in the winter they came back to the river valleys; they also cultivated fields and grew millet, barley, rye, and other cereal plants.

Krotov culture already had an established complex producing animal husbandry system of horses and cattle, with a significant proportion of small ruminants with equal proportions of sheep and goats. The traditions of hunting and fishing are obvious, possibly some floodplain agriculture. Crafts included metalworking, developed pottery-making, bone and stone processing.

The Krotov culture people did not have their own metallurgy; they obtained metal ingots from suppliers in Altai, Mountain Shoria, Kuzbass, and eastern Kazakhstan. Their art was in mastering molding in bilateral forms.

== Genetic composition ==
Results of correlation between the traditional anthropological group-differentiating complex of craniometrical and odontological traits with the markers of mitochondrial DNA were presented in the professorial dissertation of T.A. Chikisheva, 2010.

== Literature ==
- Molodin V.I., Romashchenko A.G., Voivod M.I., Sitnikov V.V., Chikisheva T. "Paleogenetic analysis of the Siberia population gene pool" / Integral Program for Basic Research, Novosibirsk: Siberian Branch of RAS, 1998 (in Russian)
- Chikisheva T.A., "Dynamics of anthropological differentiation in population of southern Western Siberia in Neolithic - Early Iron Age", Professorial dissertation, Novosibirsk, 2010, section Conclusions https://www.dissercat.com/content/dinamika-antropologicheskoi-differentsiatsii-naseleniya-yuga-zapadnoi-sibiri-v-epokhi-neolit (in Russian)
