= Yelunino =

Yelunino Елунино
- Selo
- Location within Altai Krai Location within Russia Location within Continental Asia
- Coordinates: 53°26′N 82°59′E
- Country: Russia
- Region: Altai Krai
- District: Pavlovsky District
- Time zone: UTC+7:00

Yelunino (Russian: Елунино) is a rural locality (a selo) and the administrative center of Yeluninsky Selsoviet, Pavlovsky District, Altai Krai, Russia. The population was 676 as of 2013. There are 12 streets.

== Geography ==
Yelunino is located 14 km north of Pavlovsk (the district's administrative centre) by road. Borovikovo and Pavlovsk are the nearest rural localities.
