= Seima-Turbino culture =

Bronze Age archaeological culture of Eurasia

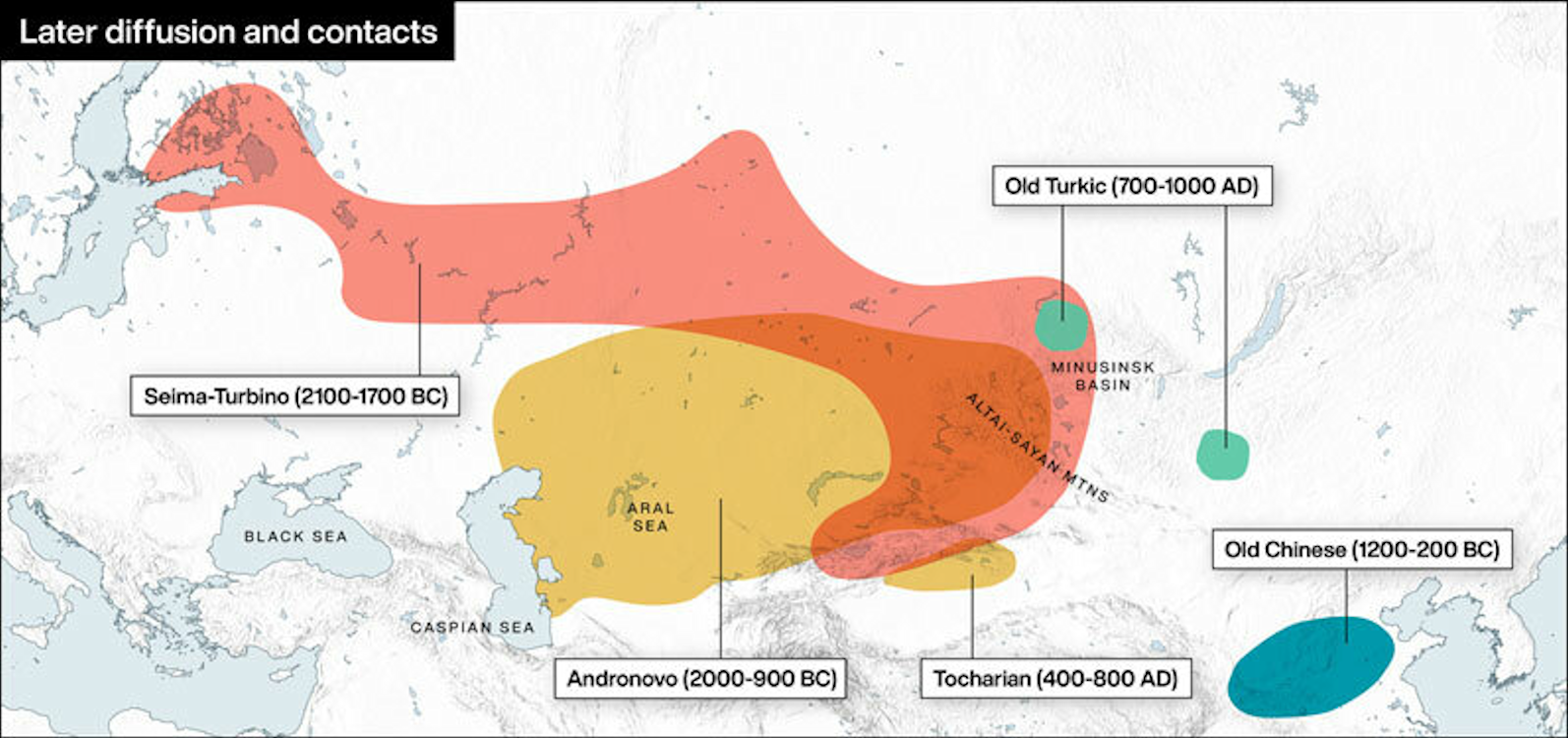
- The Seima-Turbino phenomenon ( ) in Eurasia.
- Geographical range: Northern Eurasia
- Period: Bronze Age
- Dates: c. 2200 BC – 1900 BC
- Preceded by: Afanasievo culture, Corded Ware culture, Sintashta culture, Okunev culture
- Followed by: Andronovo culture, Karasuk culture, Netted Ware culture

The Seima-Turbino culture, also Seima-Turbinsky culture or Seima-Turbino phenomenon, is a pattern of burial sites with similar bronze artifacts. Seima-Turbino is attested across northern Eurasia, particularly Siberia and Central Asia, maybe from Fennoscandia to Mongolia, Northeast China, Russian Far East, Korea, and Japan. The homeland is considered to be the Altai Mountains. These findings have suggested a common point of cultural origin, possession of advanced metal working technology, and unexplained rapid migration. The buried were nomadic warriors and metal-workers, traveling on horseback or two-wheeled carts.

Anthony (2007) dated Seima-Turbino to "before 1900 BCE onwards." Currently, both Childebayeva (2017) and Marchenko (2017) date the Seima-Turbino complex to ca. 2200 – 1900 BCE.

The name derives from the Seyma cemetery near the confluence of the Oka River and Volga River, first excavated around 1914, and the Turbino cemetery in Perm, first excavated in 1924.

== Characteristics ==
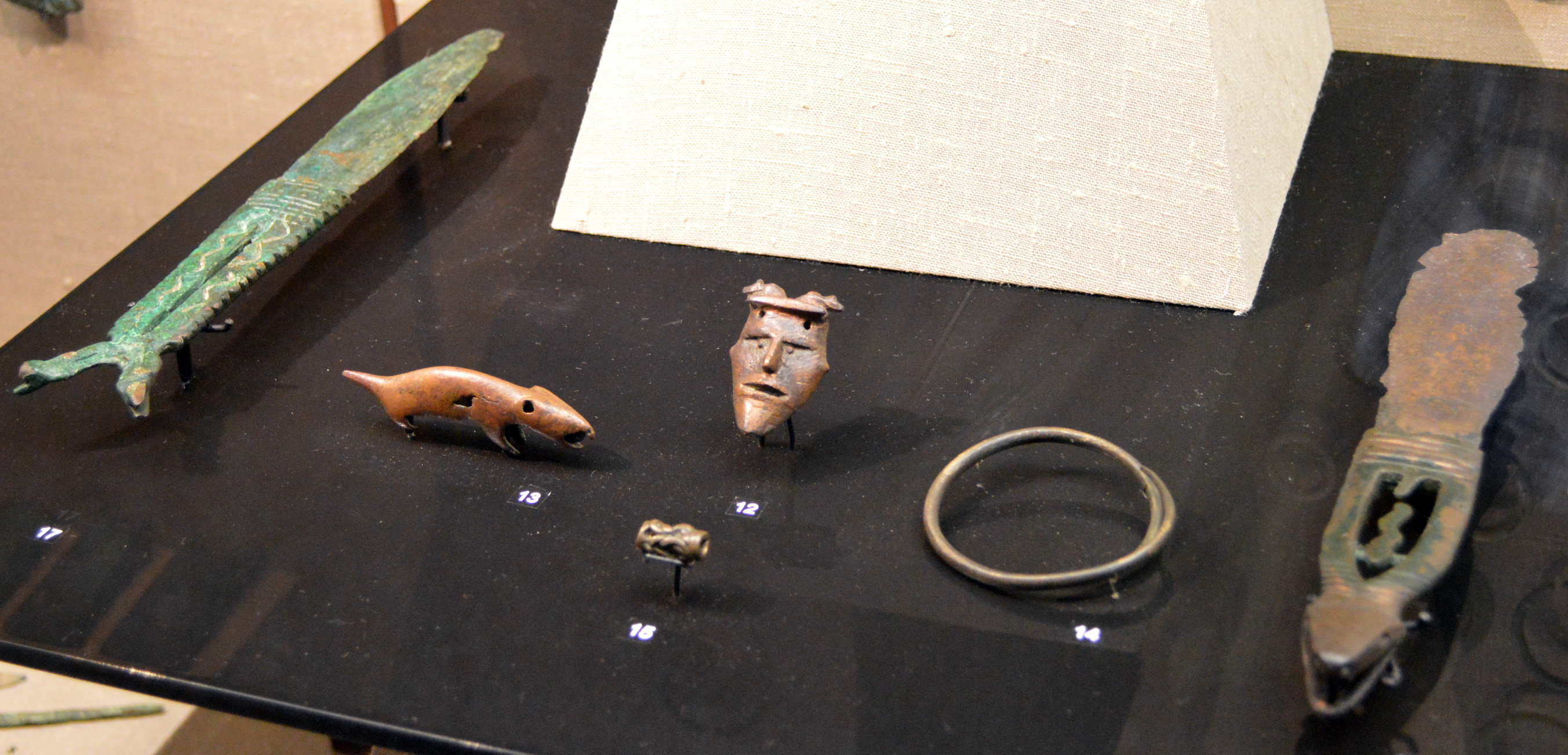
Seima-Turbino artifacts from Russia

Seima-Turbino (ST) weapons contain tin bronze ore originating from the Sayan and Altai Mountains region (western and northern Mongolia and southern Siberia), with further ST discoveries pointing more specifically to the southeastern portions of the Altai and Xinjiang. These sites have been identified with the origin of the ST culture.

Originally, the lack of tin ore in Eurasian steppes meant that metallurgy was initially based on copper or "arsenical bronze" (actually copper with more or less arsenic content, with the effect of hardening it). It is only from the rise of the Seima-Turbino culture in the Saiano-Altai region that tin bronze (alloys of copper and tin) began to be used, initially through forging and progressively through casting techniques, marking the true start of the Bronze Age.

=== Artifacts and weapons ===
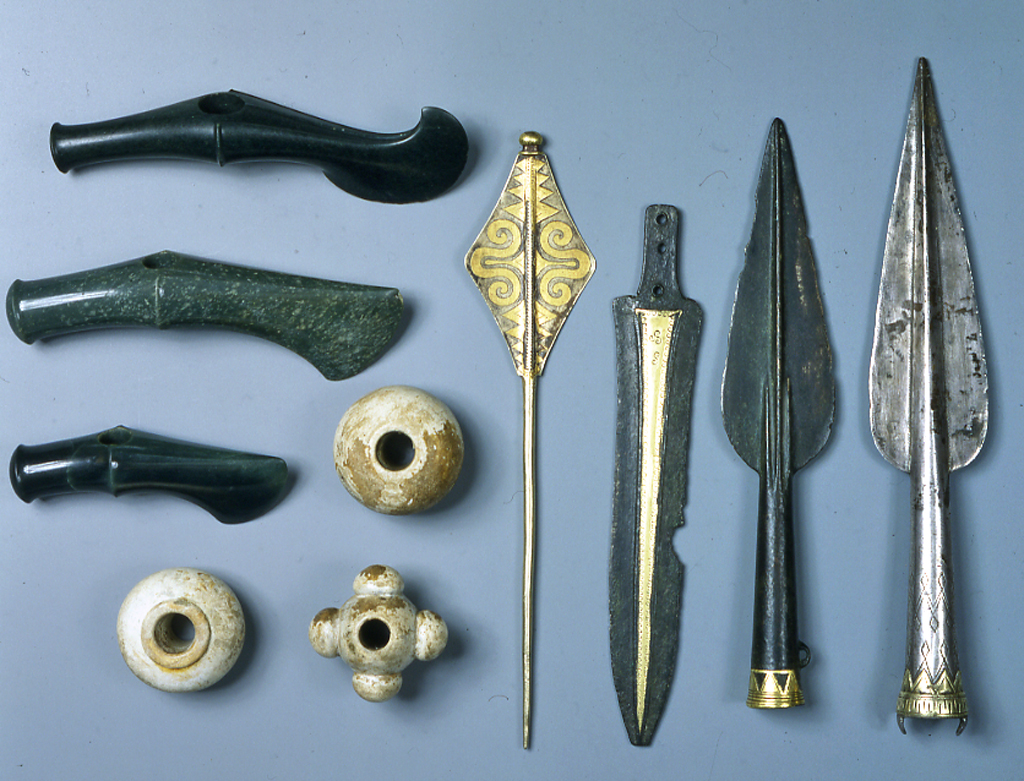
Artifacts from the Borodino treasure, Moldova

The bronzes found were technologically advanced for the time, including lost wax casting, and showed high degree of artist input in their design. Horses were the most common shapes for the hilts of blades. Weapons such as spearheads with hooks, single-bladed knives and socketed axes with geometric designs traveled west and east from Xinjiang.

=== Dispersal ===
The culture spread from the Altai mountains to the west and to the east.

These cultures are noted for being nomadic forest and steppe societies with metal working, sometimes without having first developed agricultural methods. The development of this metalworking ability appears to have occurred quite quickly.

ST bronzes have been discovered as far west as the Baltic Sea and the Borodino treasure in Moldavia.

== Theories on transmission ==
=== Transmission of metallurgy to China ===
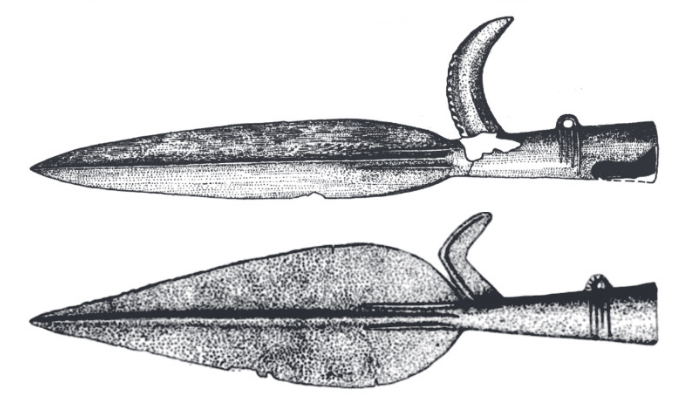
Seima-Turbino socketed spearheads with single side hook started to be introduced in China c. 2100-2000 BCE

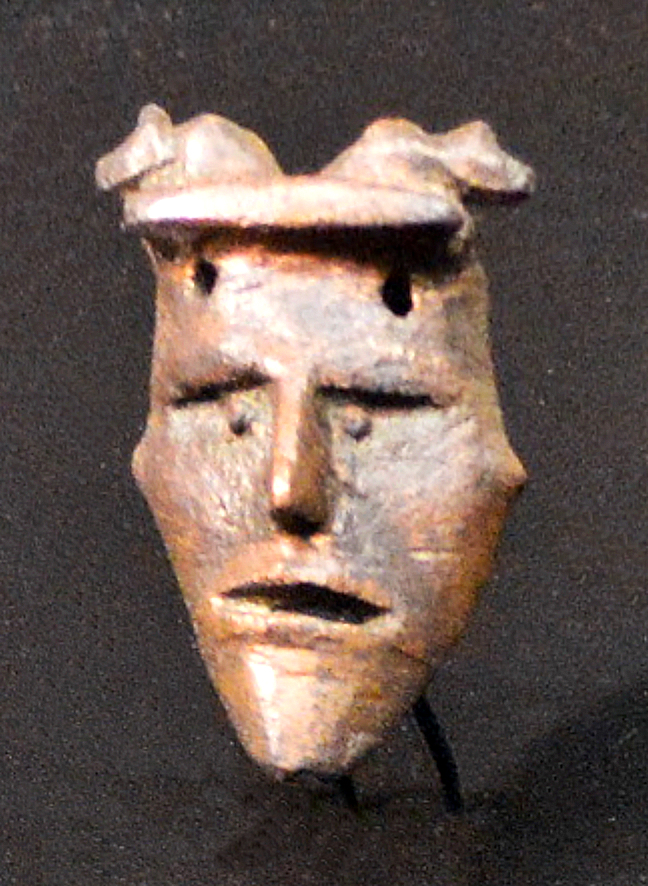
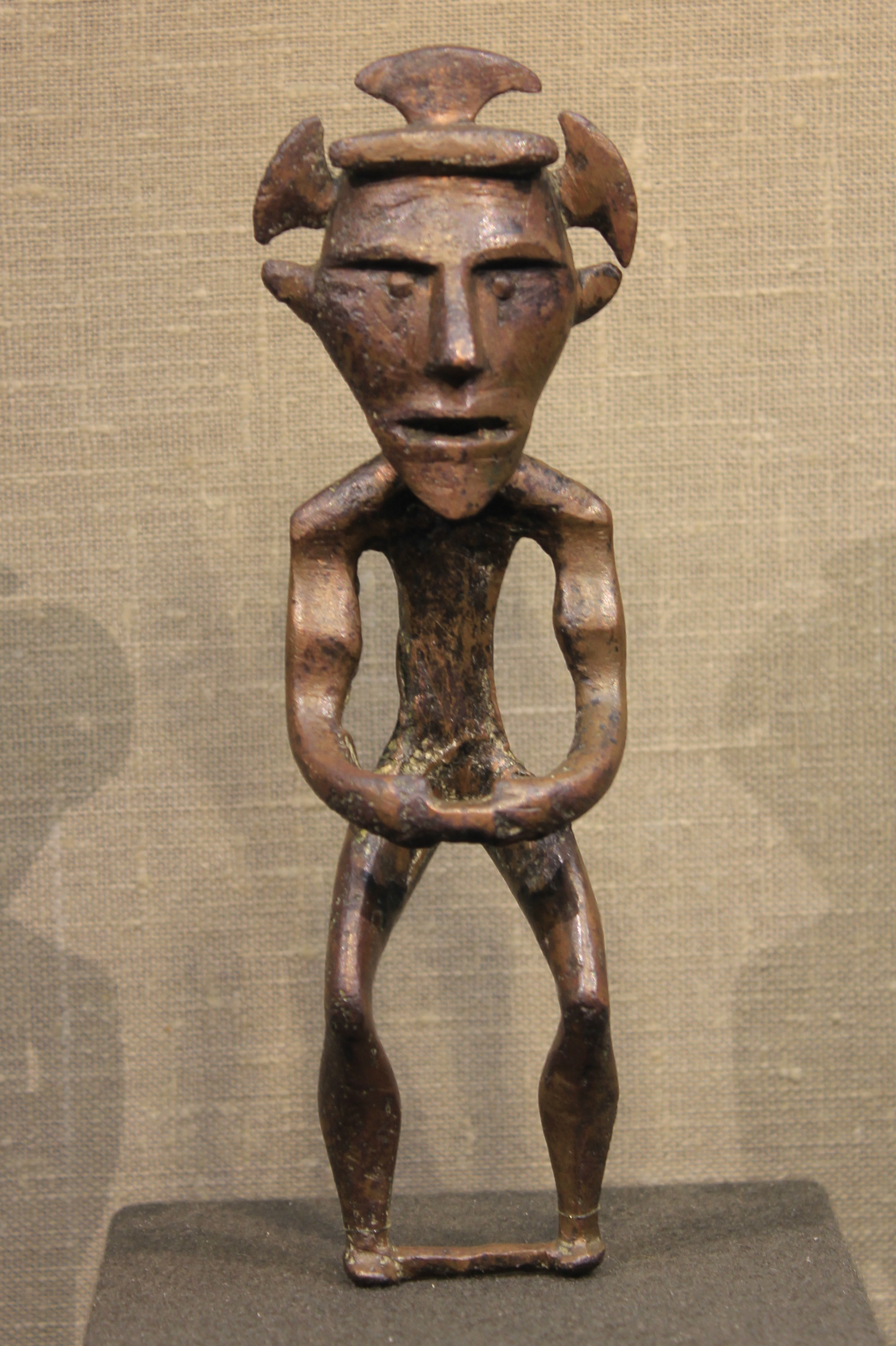
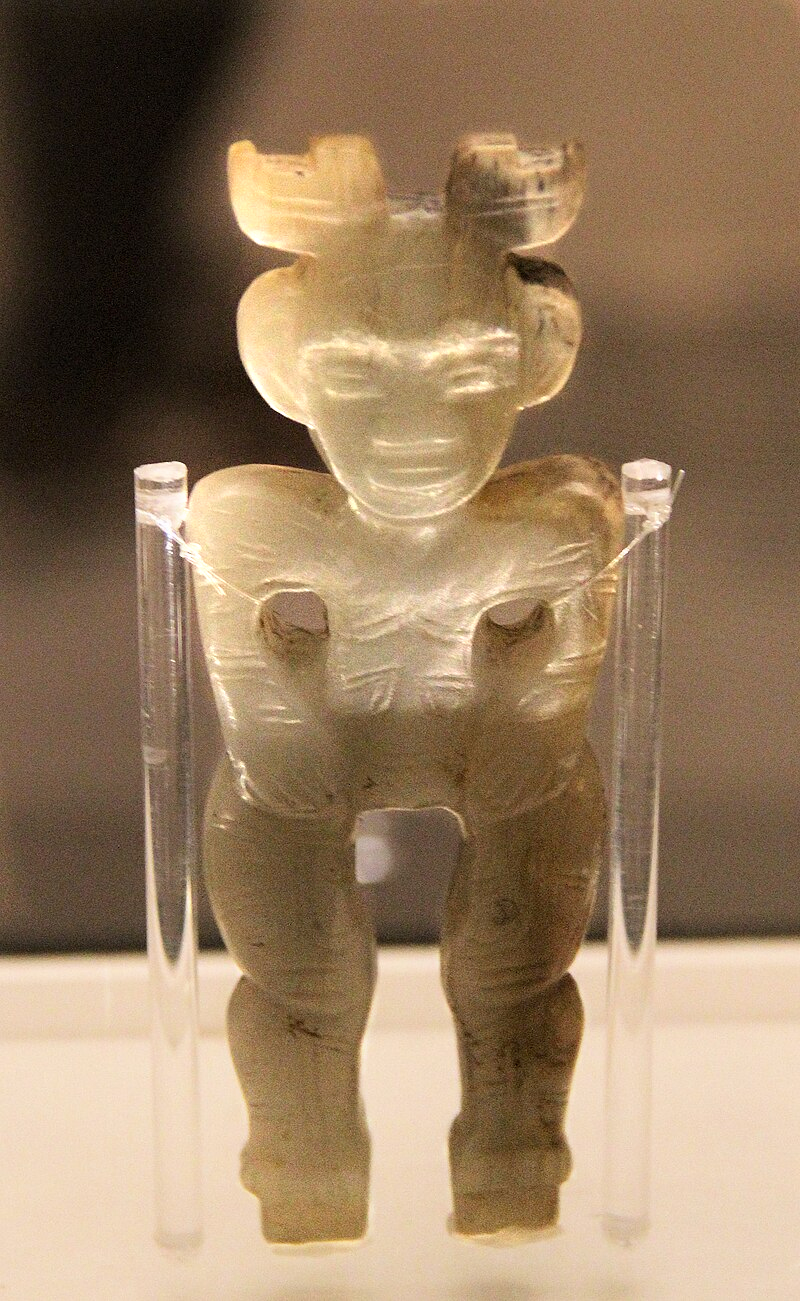
Left and center: Seima-Turbino bronze figurines. Right: possible Chinese jade adaptation (tomb of Fu Hao).

The Seima-Turbino culture may have been identical with the northern tribes of the Guifang ("Devil's Country") reported by Chinese historical chronicles of the Shang dynasty (c. 1600 BC–c. 1046 BC). Several of the Shang dynasty artifacts of the Yin Ruins and from the tomb of Fu Hao (died c.1200 BCE), excavated in Shang capital of Anyang, are similar to Seima-Turbino culture artifacts, such as socketed spearheads with a single side hook, jade figurines and knives with deer-headed pommel. These Late Shang artifacts, visibly derived from the Seima-Turbino culture to the north, were made precisely at the same time the Shang reported intense protracted conflicts with the northern tribes of the "Guifang". This would suggest that the Guifang were the Altaic Seima-Turbino culture itself, and that their century-long conflict with the Shang led to the transfer of various object and manufacturing techniques.

Particularly, the introduction of the socketed spearheads with a single side hook seems to date back to the period of the Taosi culture, when the earliest and most faithful Seima-Turbino types start to appear in China, circa 2100-2000 BCE. These early artifacts suggest that Chinese bronze metallurgy initially derived from the cultures of the Eurasian steppes. Soon however, China was able to appropriate this technology and refine it, particularly through its mastery of bronze casting, to create a highly sophisticated and massive bronze industry.

The influence of Semino-Turbino culture is also detected in the middle Yangtze River region.

Various types of Seima-Turbino style objects are known from the early cultures of China:

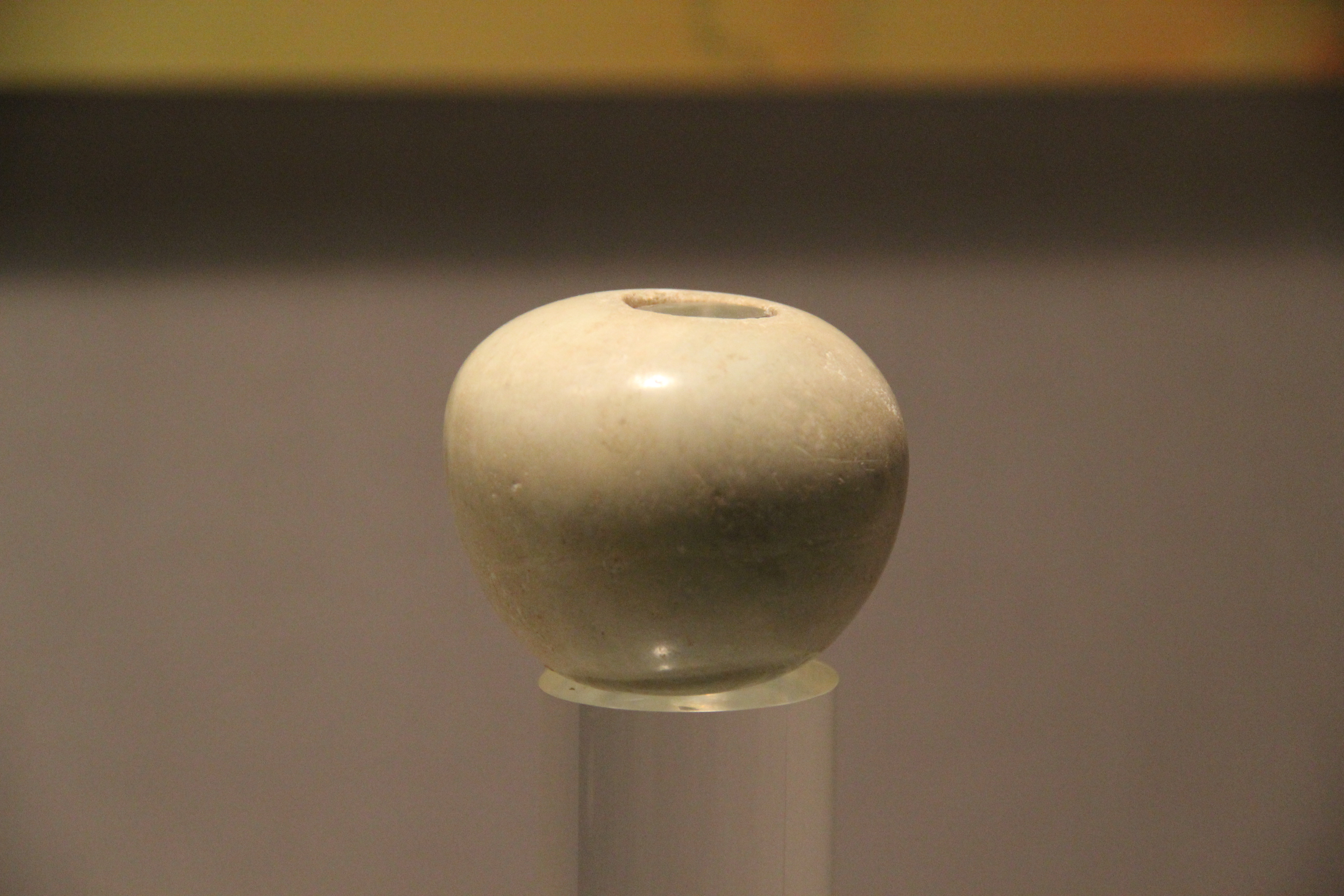
Stone macehead, Siba culture.

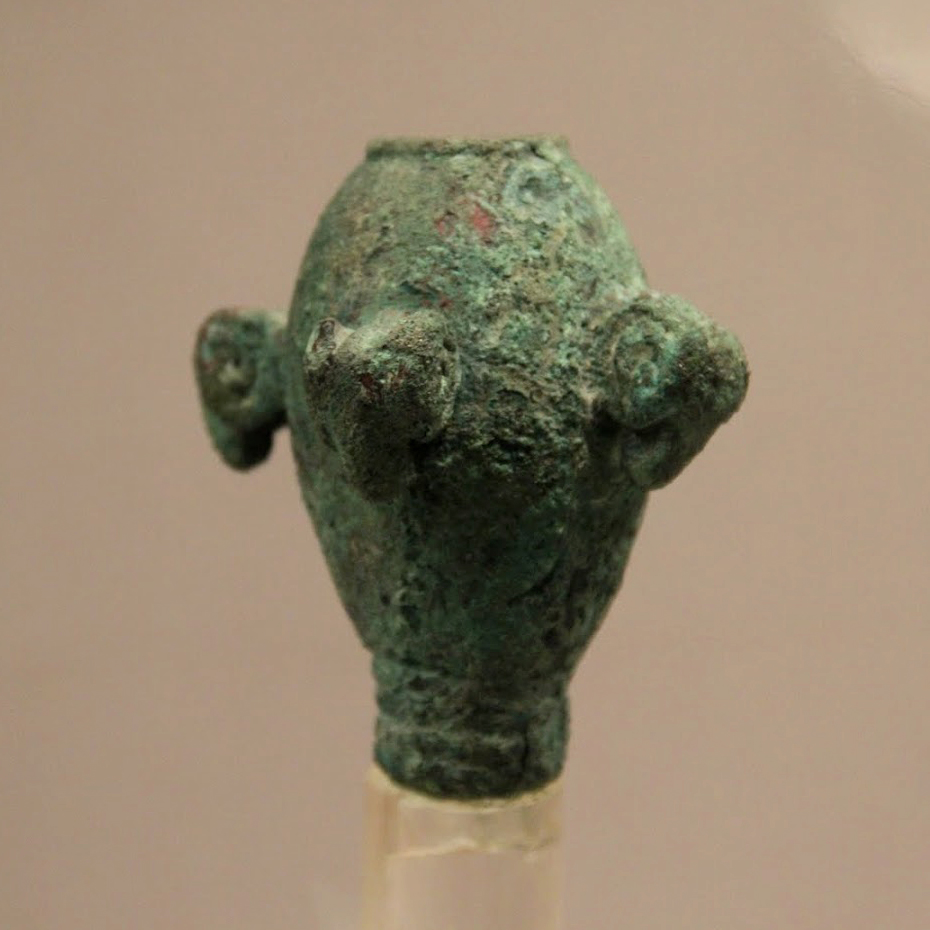
Bronze mace head with 4 sheep, Siba Culture, 1900-1400 BCE.

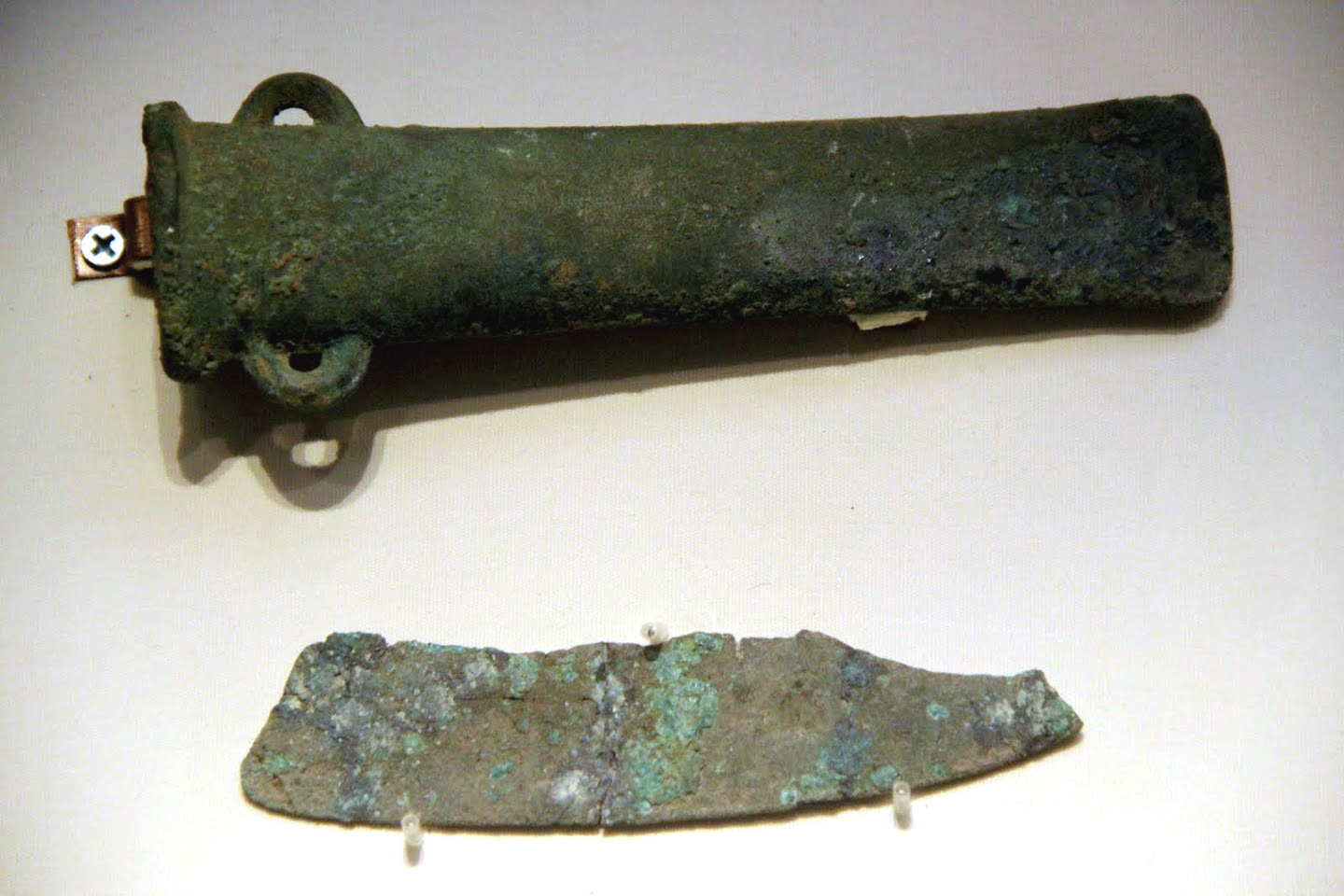
Bronze axe and copper knife, Qijia culture, Gansu.

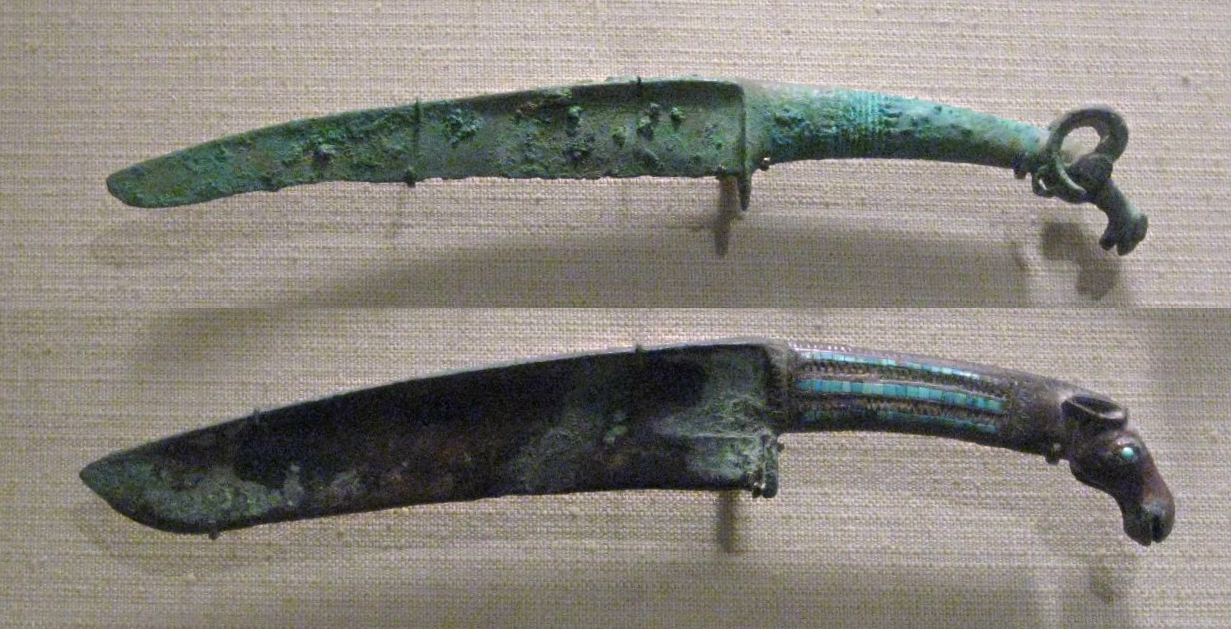
Shang dynasty curved bronze knives with turquoise inlays and animal pommel.

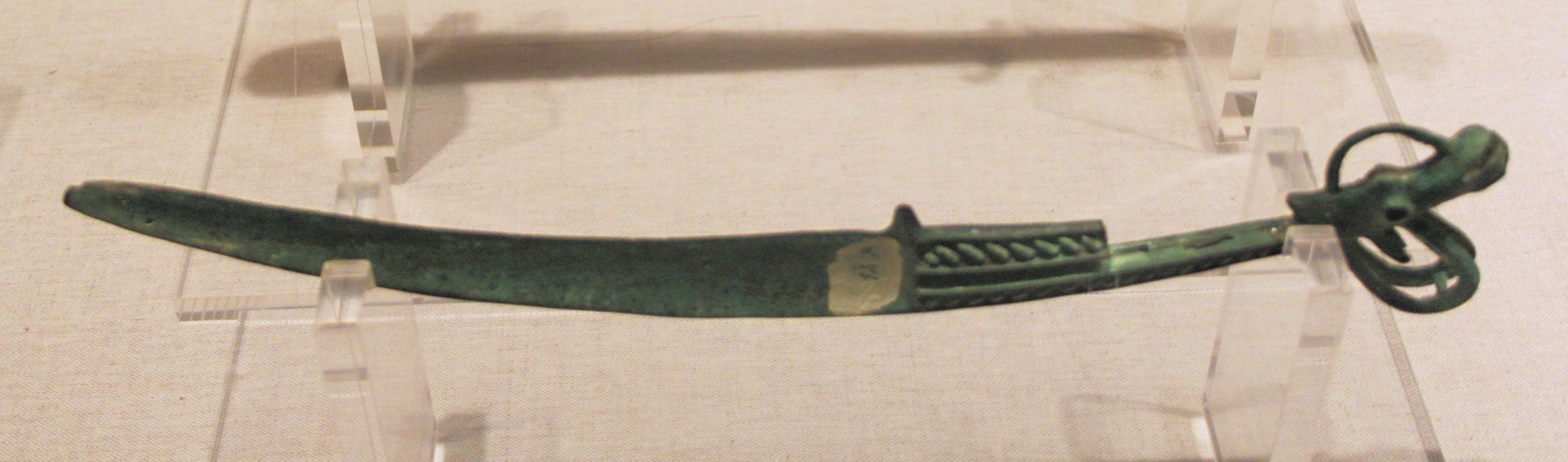
Seima-Turbino type Late Shang dynasty bronze ibex-headed knife. Shaanxi Museum.

=== Transmission into Southeast Asia ===
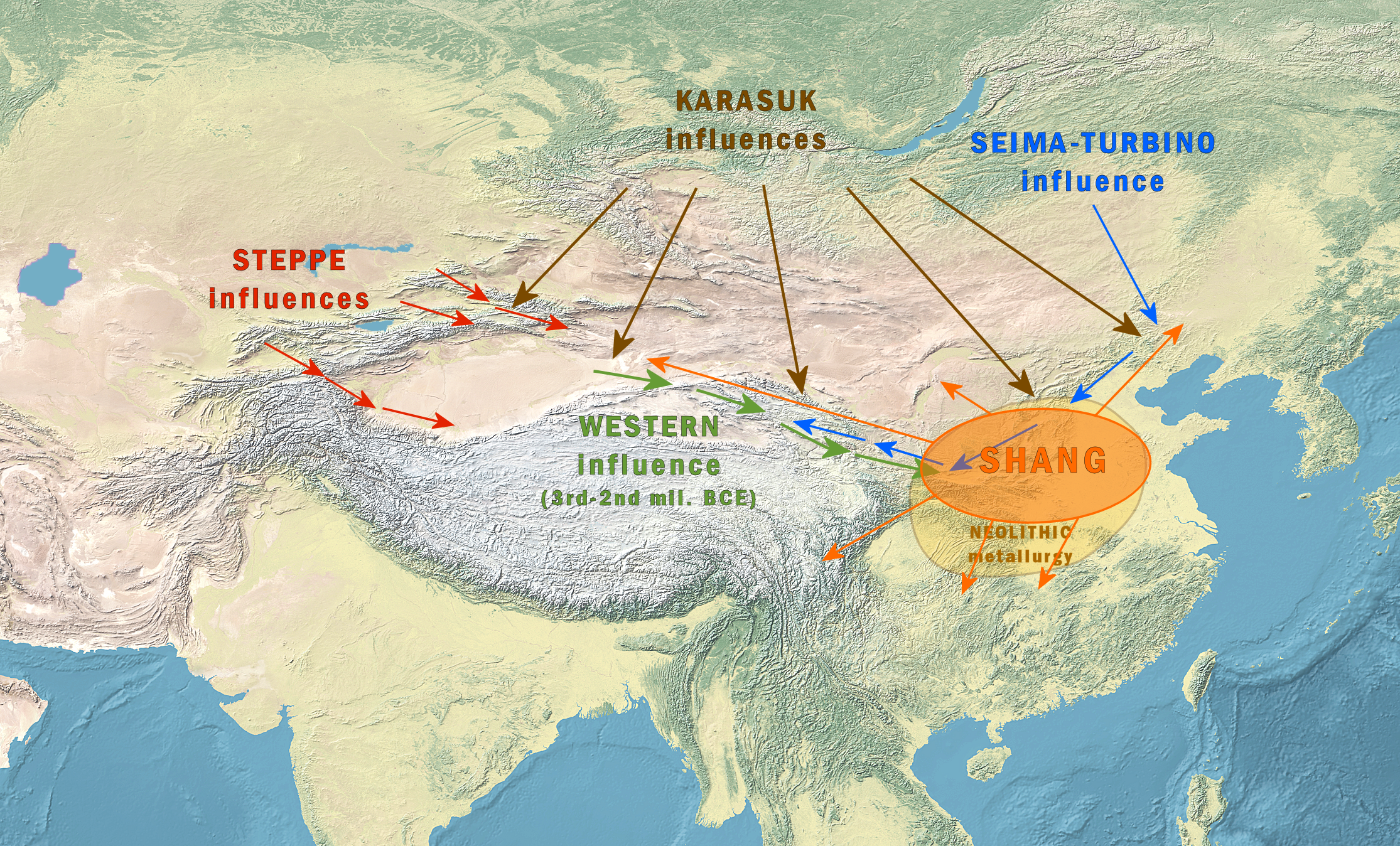
Influences on Chinese metallurgy.

It has been conjectured that changes in climate in this region around 2000 BCE and the ensuing ecological, economic and political changes triggered a rapid and massive migration westward into northeast Europe, eastward into Korea, and southward into Southeast Asia (Vietnam and Thailand) across a frontier of some 4,000 miles. Supposedly this migration took place in just five to six generations and enabled people from Finland in the west to Thailand in the east to employ the same metal working technology and in some areas, horse breeding and riding.

However, further excavations and research in Ban Chiang and Ban Non Wat (both Thailand) argue the idea that Seima-Turbino brought metal workings into southeast Asia is based on inaccurate and unreliable radiocarbon dating at the site of Ban Chiang. It is now agreed by virtually every specialist in Southeast Asian prehistory that the Bronze Age of Southeast Asia occurred too late to be related to ST, and the cast bronzes are quite different.

== Archaeogenetics ==
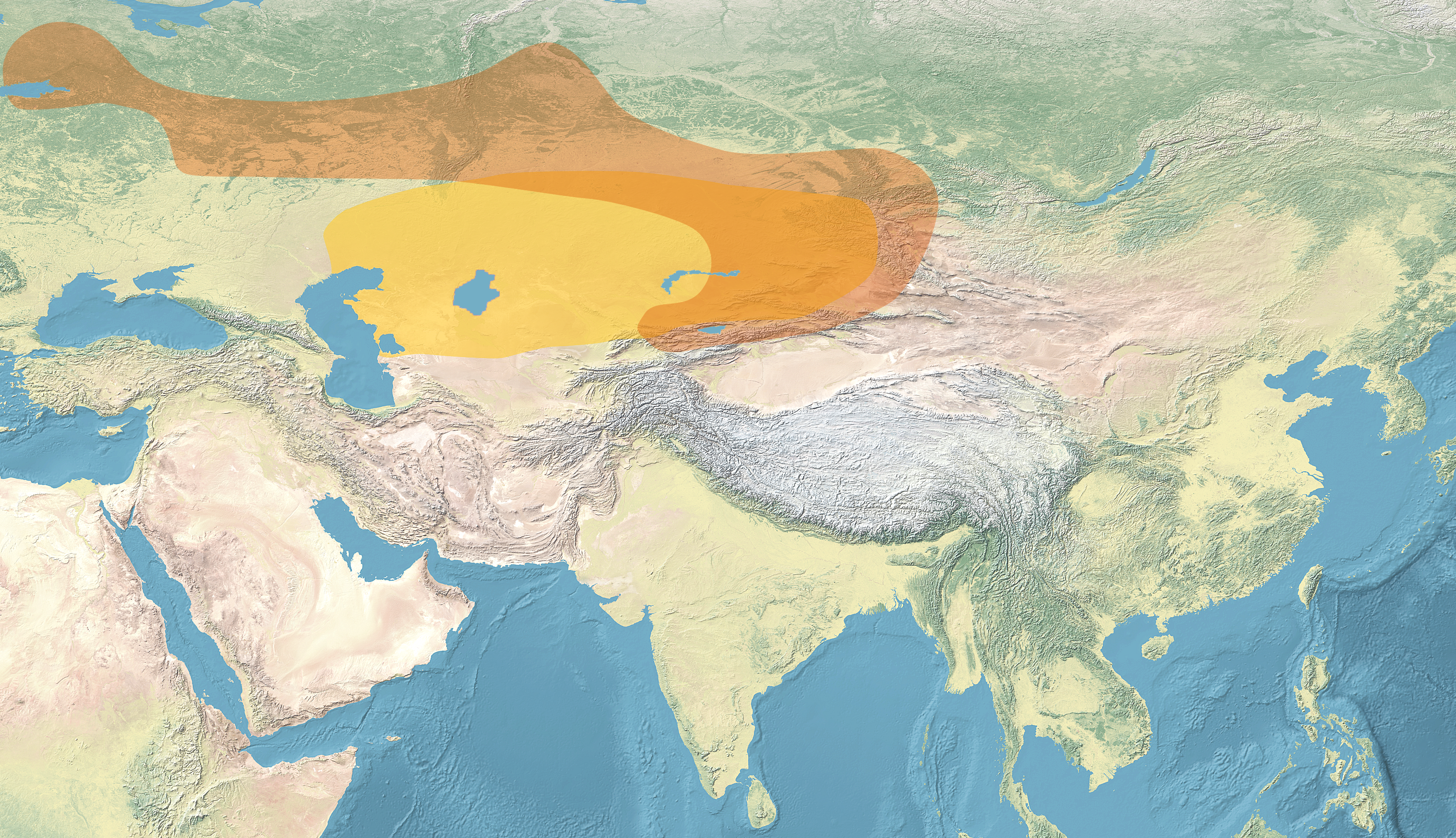
Seima-Turbino culture ( ), Andronovo culture ( ), and other contemporary cultures and polities circa 2000 BCE.

Childebayeva et al. (2024) analysed DNA from nine individuals (eight males and one female) buried at the Seima-Turbino-associated site of Rostovka in Omsk (Russia), one of the few Seima-Turbino sites with preserved human remains. The individuals were found to carry diverse ancestry components, ranging between a genetic profile represented by the Western Steppe Middle-Late Bronze Age Herders (similar to the Sintashta culture), to that of the Late Neolithic/Bronze Age Eastern Siberians, which peaks among Uralic-speaking Nganasan people. They also displayed affinity to Okunevo culture remains, which in turn is affiliated with the Seima-Turbino culture. One male could be modelled as deriving their ancestry entirely from Sintashta Middle-Late Bronze Age. Two males were assigned to the Y-haplogroup R1a (R1a-M417 and R1a-Z645), two to C2a, one to N1a1a1a1a (N-L392), one to Q1b (Q-M346), and one to R1b1a1a (R1b-M73). The mtDNA haplogroups of the individuals included those common in both east Eurasia (A10, C1, C4, G2a1) and west Eurasia (H1, H101, U5a, R1b, R1a). According to the study authors, the Seima-Turbino associated samples "harbor an extremely diverse mix of western and eastern Eurasian ancestries", and the observed genetic heterogeneity "can either suggest a group at an early stage of admixture, or signify the heterogeneous nature of the Seima-Turbino complex." They further state that the genetic data is "temporally and geographically consistent with the proposal that Uralic languages could have spread within the ST network", which also correlates to the spread of haplogroup N-L392 and Eastern Siberian ancestry westwards.

== Gallery ==
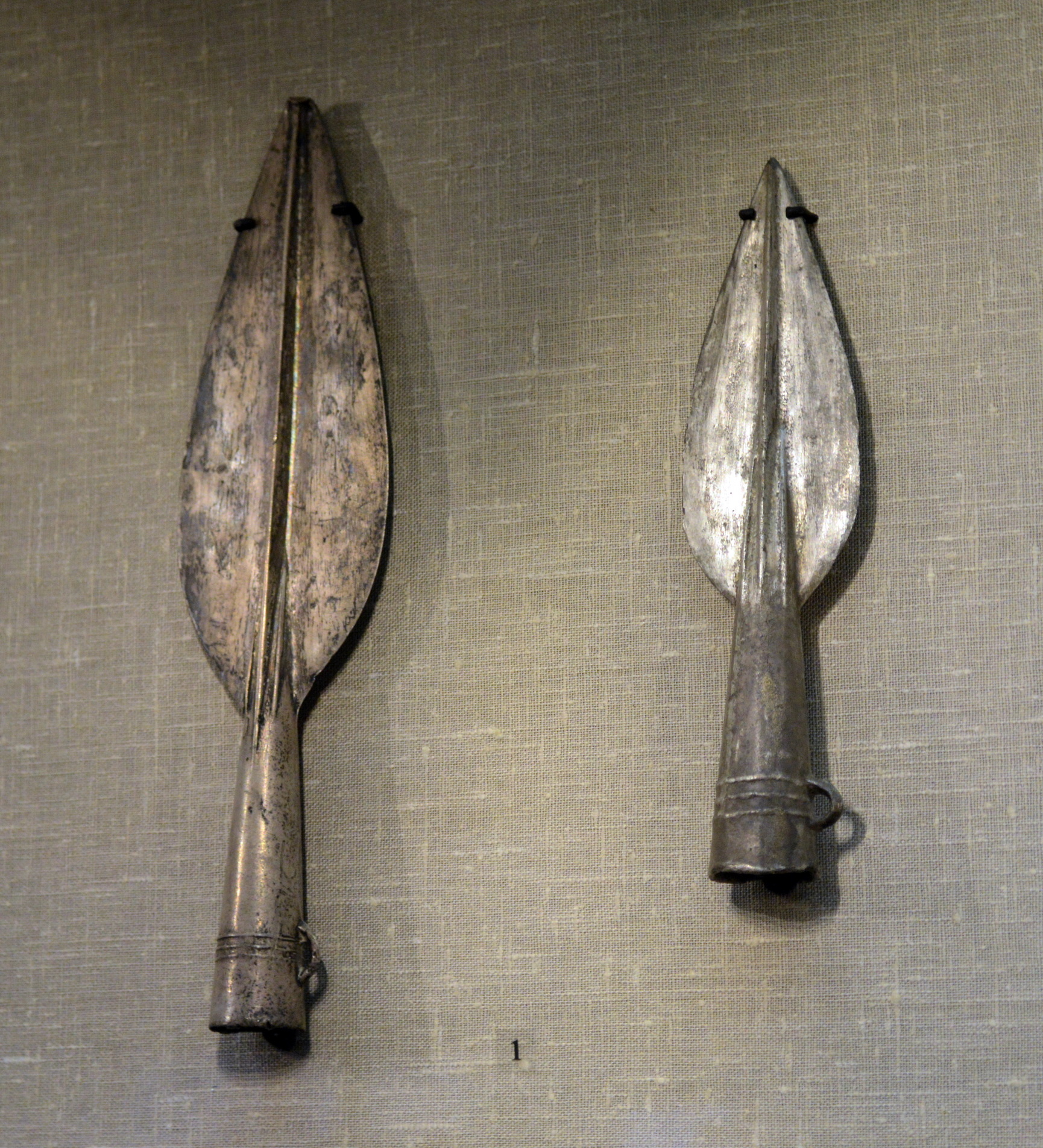
Spearheads from Turbino cemetery

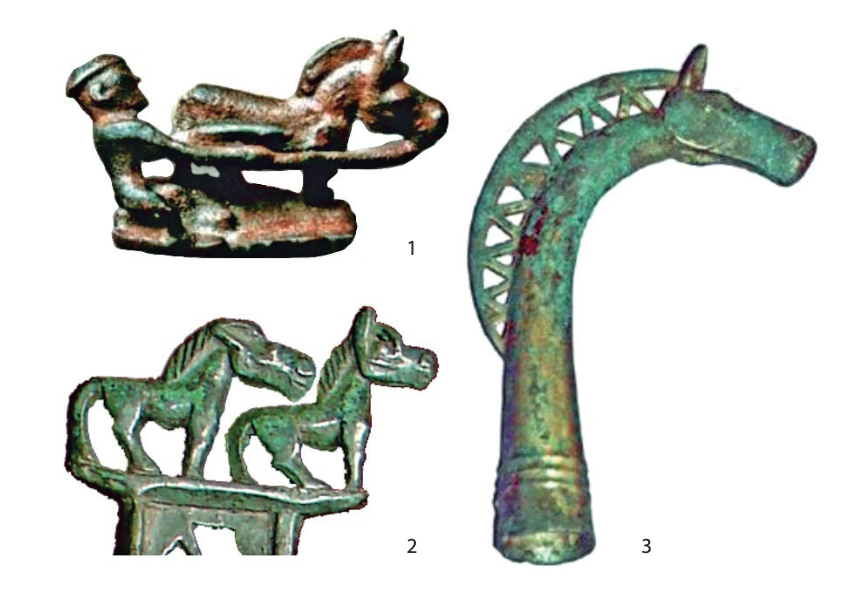
Bronze artefacts

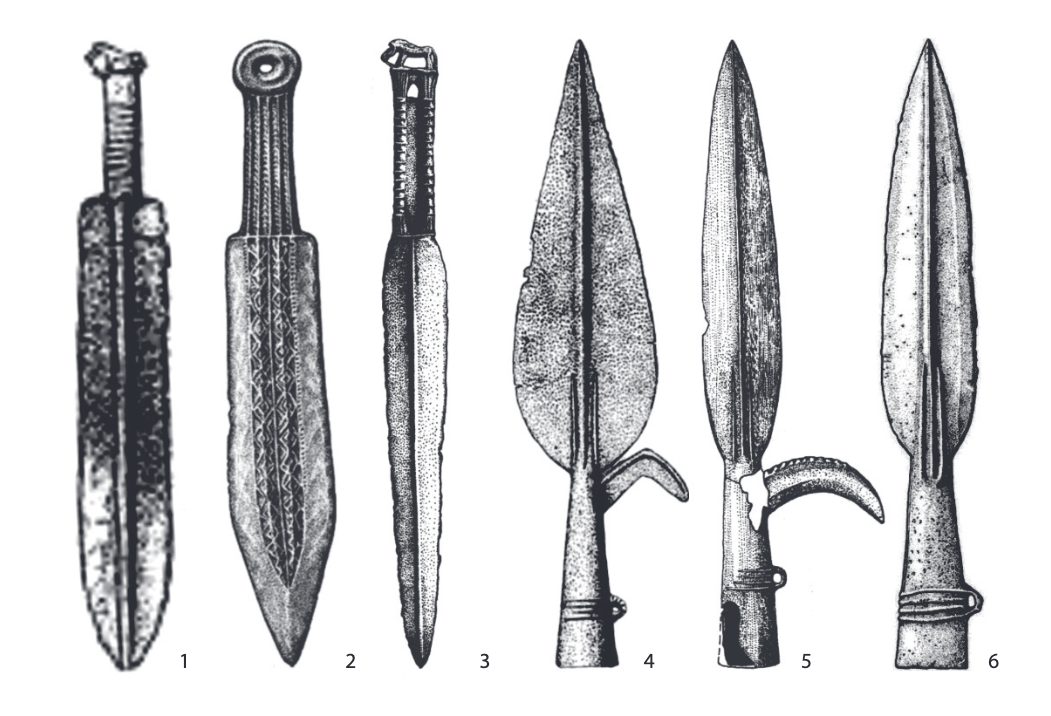
Blades and spears with single side hook

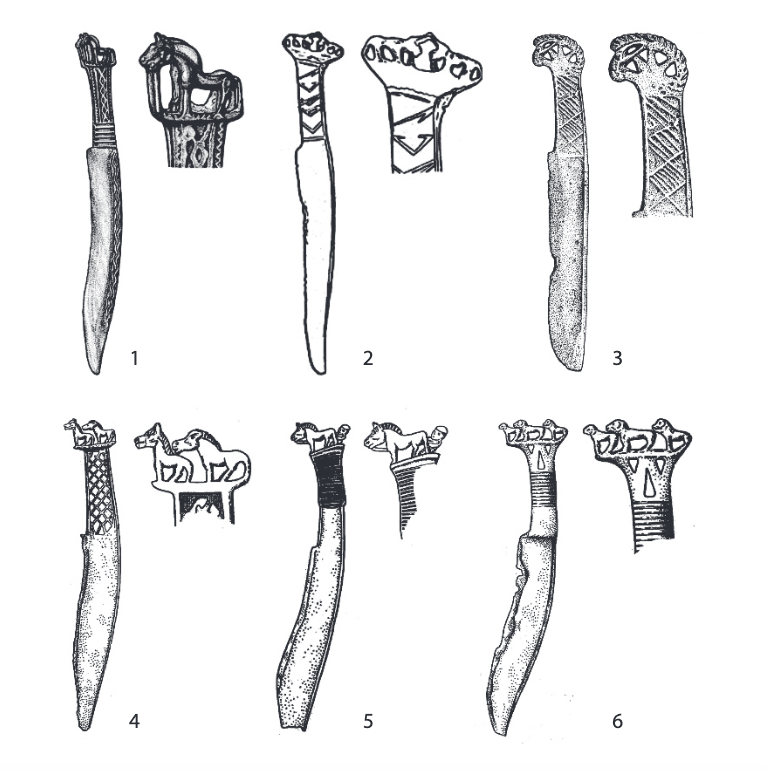
Decorated knives

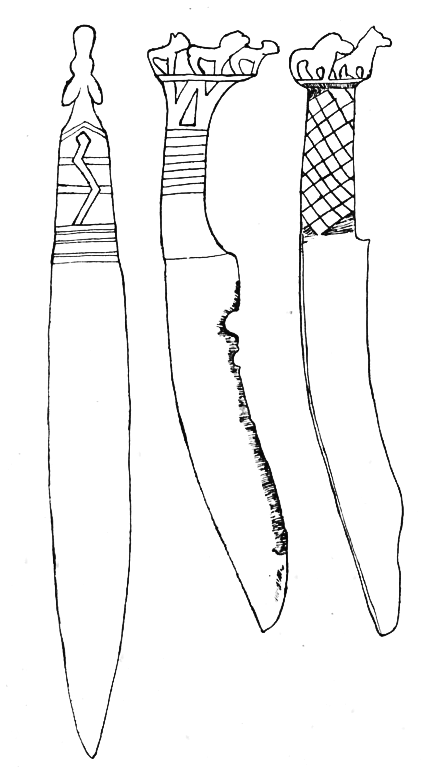
Seima-Turbino knives, Tallgren 1938

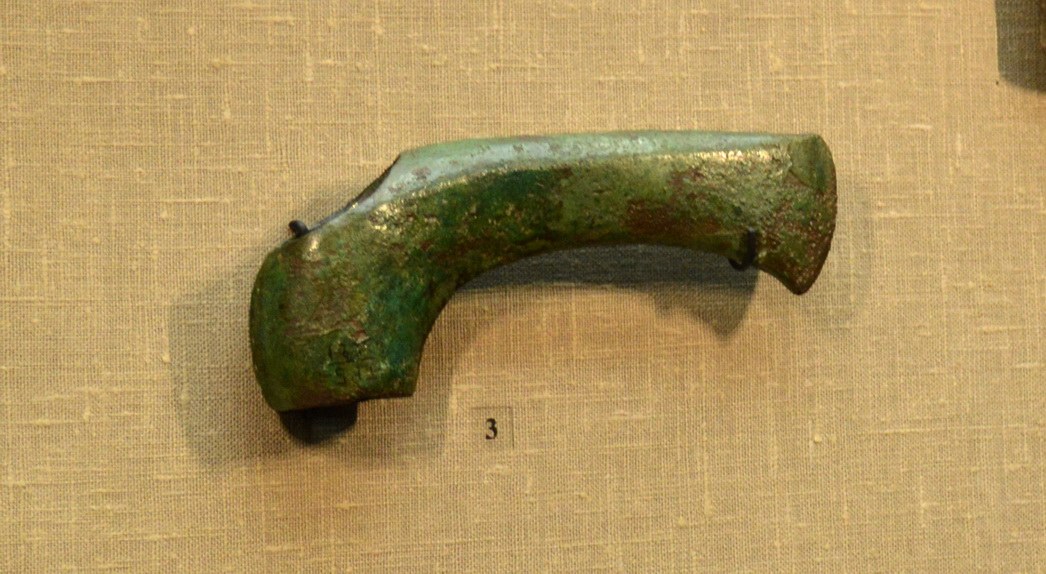
Bronze axe

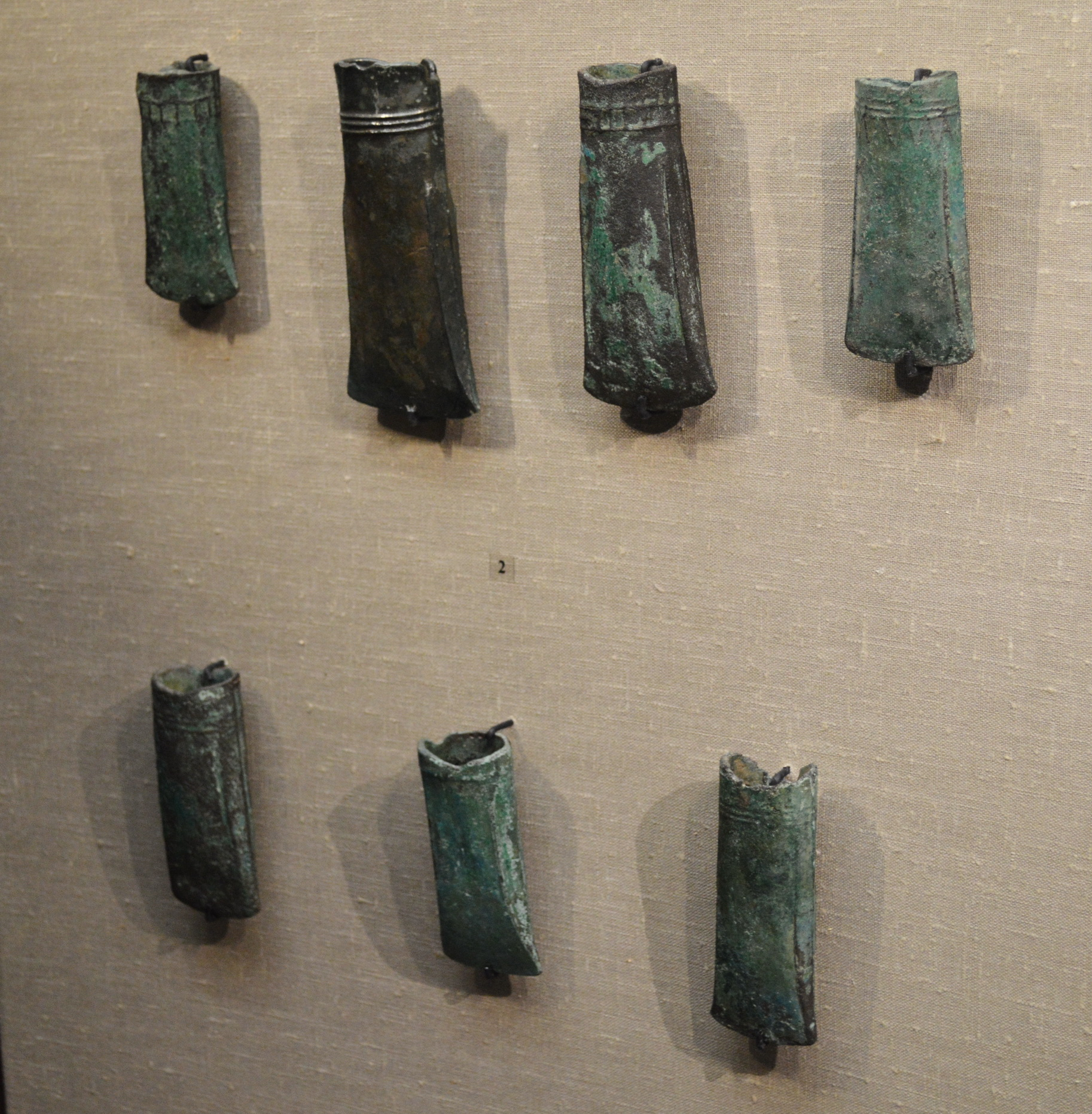
Bronze celts

== See also ==
- Andronovo culture
- Sintashta culture
- Karasuk culture
- Krotov culture

== Sources ==
- Christian, David (1998). A History of Russia, Central Asia, and Mongolia. Wiley. ISBN 978-0-631-20814-3.
- Anthony, David W. (2007). The Horse, the Wheel, and Language: How Bronze-Age riders from the Eurasian steppes shaped the modern world.
- Marchenko, Z.V.; Svyatko, S.V.; Molodin, V.I.; Grishin, A.E.; Rykun, M.P. (October 2017). "Radiocarbon chronology of complexes with Seima-Turbino type objects (Bronze Age) in southwestern Siberia" (PDF). Radiocarbon. 59 (5): 1381–1397. Bibcode:2017Radcb..59.1381M. doi:10.1017/RDC.2017.24. S2CID 133742189 – via pureadmin.qub.ac.uk.
- Chernykh, Evgenil Nikolaevich (1992). Ancient Metallurgy in the USSR: The Early Metal Age. New Studies in Archaeology. Translated by Wright, Sarah. Cambridge, UK: Cambridge University Press. ISBN 9780-521-25257-7.
