= Undeciphered writing systems =

Writing and symbol systems without accepted decipherments

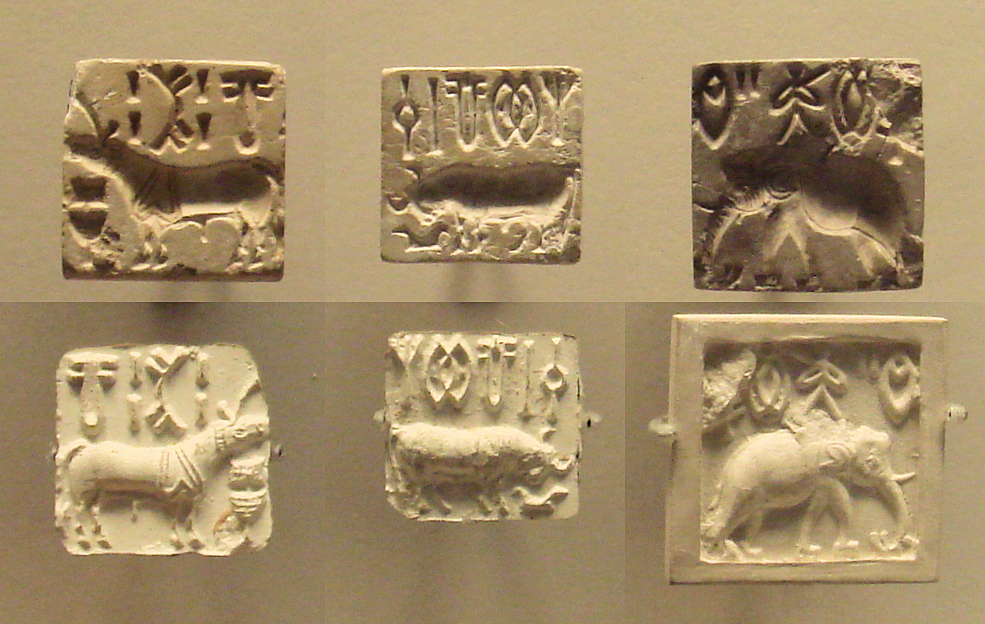
Seals showing the Indus script, an ancient undeciphered script

Undeciphered writing systems are any written or inscribed symbols for which no decipherment has achieved broad acceptance in the specialist literature.

While most examples are ancient, a small number are medieval or modern. In some cases the evidence is too limited to determine whether the marks represent a true writing system, a form of proto-writing, or a set of non-linguistic symbols; modern artistic traditions such as asemic writing likewise imitate the appearance of writing while intentionally withholding stable linguistic meaning. It is not clear all these cases were intended as writing systems with linguistic function or representation, and some inscribed symbols or characters may have other explanations such as being artwork.

Difficulties in decipherment commonly arise from one or more of the following: the absence of bilingual texts or other external "anchors" (such as securely identifiable names or dates); uncertain or unknown underlying languages (including possible language isolates); small corpora; and damage or loss of archaeological context needed to test proposed readings against use and genre. In some corpora, an additional difficulty is uncertainty over whether the signs constitute writing at all (as has often been argued for the Vinča symbols).

Various decipherment claims have been proposed for several items listed here (including the Indus script, the Phaistos Disc, and the Isthmian/Epi-Olmec script), but these proposals remain disputed and have not achieved broad acceptance in the scholarly literature unless otherwise noted.

== Inclusion criteria ==
This list includes writing systems and sign systems that are commonly described in reliable secondary sources as undeciphered, not fully deciphered, or of uncertain decipherment. Items of disputed authenticity or disputed status as writing are explicitly identified as such.

== Proto-writing ==
Certain forms of proto-writing remain undeciphered and, because of limited evidence and uncertain linguistic affiliation, may never be deciphered.

=== Neolithic signs in China ===
==== Yellow River civilization ====
- Jiahu symbols – Peiligang culture, c. 6600 – c. 6200 BCE.
- Damaidi symbols – Damaidi, earliest estimated dates range from the Paleolithic to approximately 3000 years ago.
- Dadiwan symbols – Dadiwan, c. 5800 – c. 5400 BCE.
- Banpo symbols – Yangshao culture, 5th millennium BCE.
- Jiangzhai symbols – Yangshao culture, 4th millennium BCE.
- Dawenkou symbols – Dawenkou culture, c. 2800 – c. 2500 BCE.
- Longshan symbols – Longshan culture, c. 2500 – c. 1900 BCE.

==== Yangtze civilization ====
- Wucheng symbols – Wucheng culture, China, c. 1600 BCE.

==== Other areas ====
- Sawveh – Guangxi, China; reported as possible proto-writing or writing in some local traditions and secondary sources; status as a historical writing system is uncertain.
Jiahu symbols

Banpo symbols

Longshan symbols

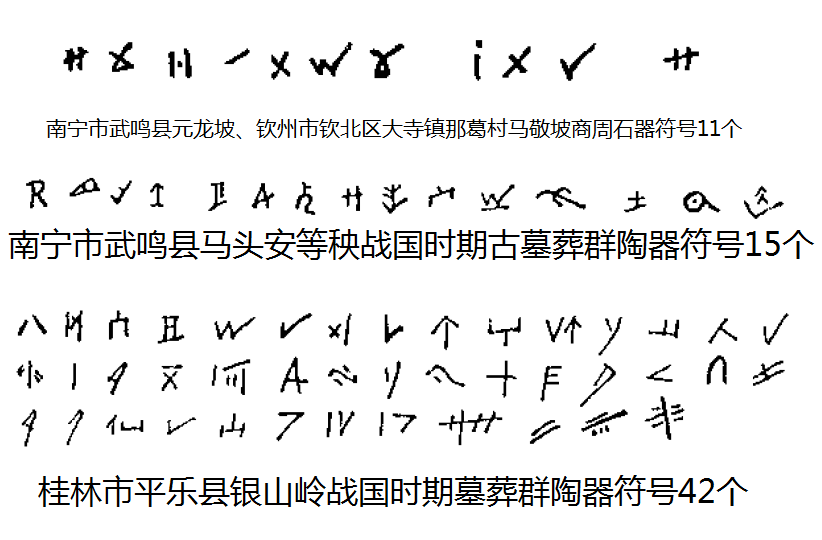
Sawveh

=== Neolithic signs in Europe ===
- Vinča symbols – Neolithic Europe (Central and Southeastern Europe), c. 4500 – c. 4000 BCE. Often treated as proto-writing or symbolic marks rather than confirmed writing.
Vinča symbols

== Asian scripts ==
=== South Asia ===
- Indus script – c. 2800 – c. 1900 BCE.
- Vikramkhol inscription – c. 1500 BCE.
- Megalithic graffiti symbols – c. 1000 BCE – c. 300 CE; proposed as possible writing and sometimes hypothesized as related to the Indus tradition, though this remains debated.
- Pushkarasari script – Gandhara, 3rd century BCE to 8th century CE.
- Shankhalipi – c. 4th – c. 8th century CE.
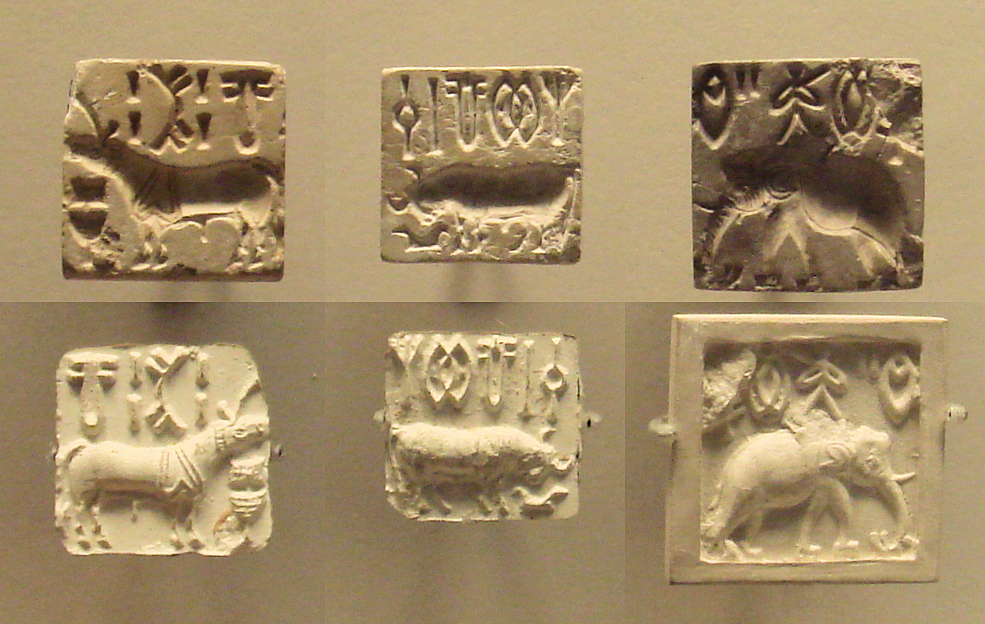
Indus script

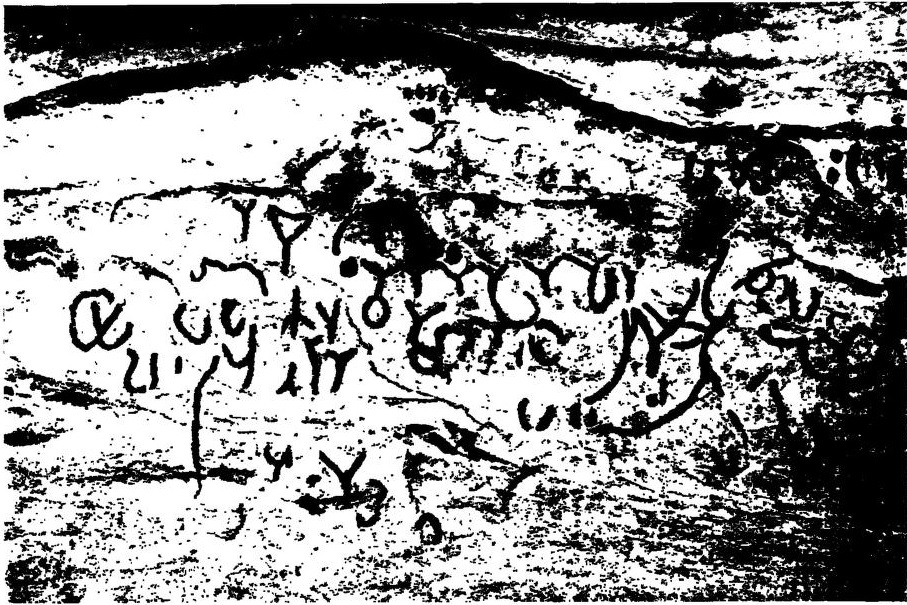
Vikramkhol inscription

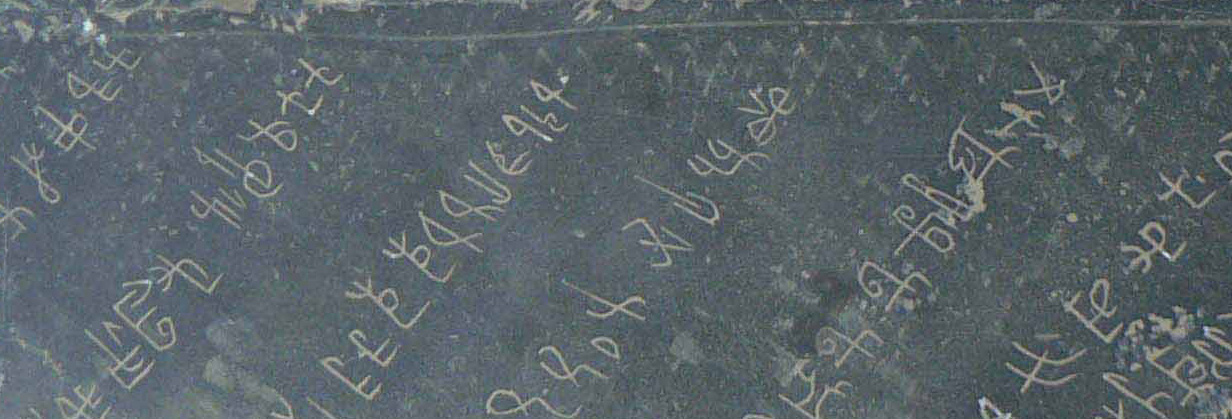
Pushkarasari script

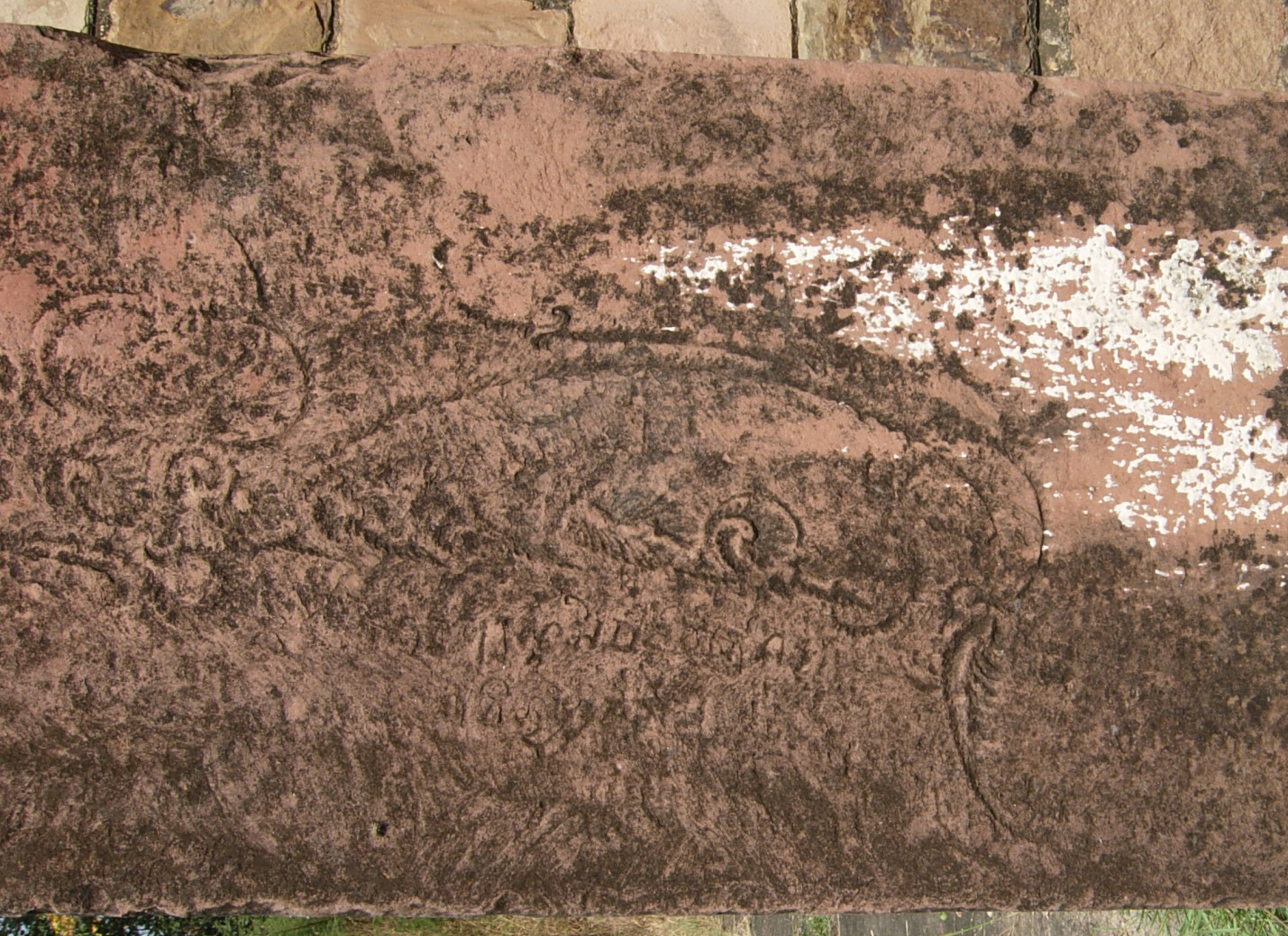
Shankhalipi

=== West Asia ===
- Proto-Elamite script – c. 3100 – c. 2900 BCE.
- Jiroft script – c. 2200 BCE.
- Byblos syllabary – Byblos, c. 1700 BCE.
- Proto-Sinaitic script - A catchall term for a corpus of inscriptions only 400 characters long from Serabit El-Khadim and other locations and that has yet to reveal a bilingual inscription for decipherment, c. 1800 BCE.
- Trojan script – Troy (Early Bronze Age); status disputed and it is unclear whether the marks constitute a single writing system or writing at all.
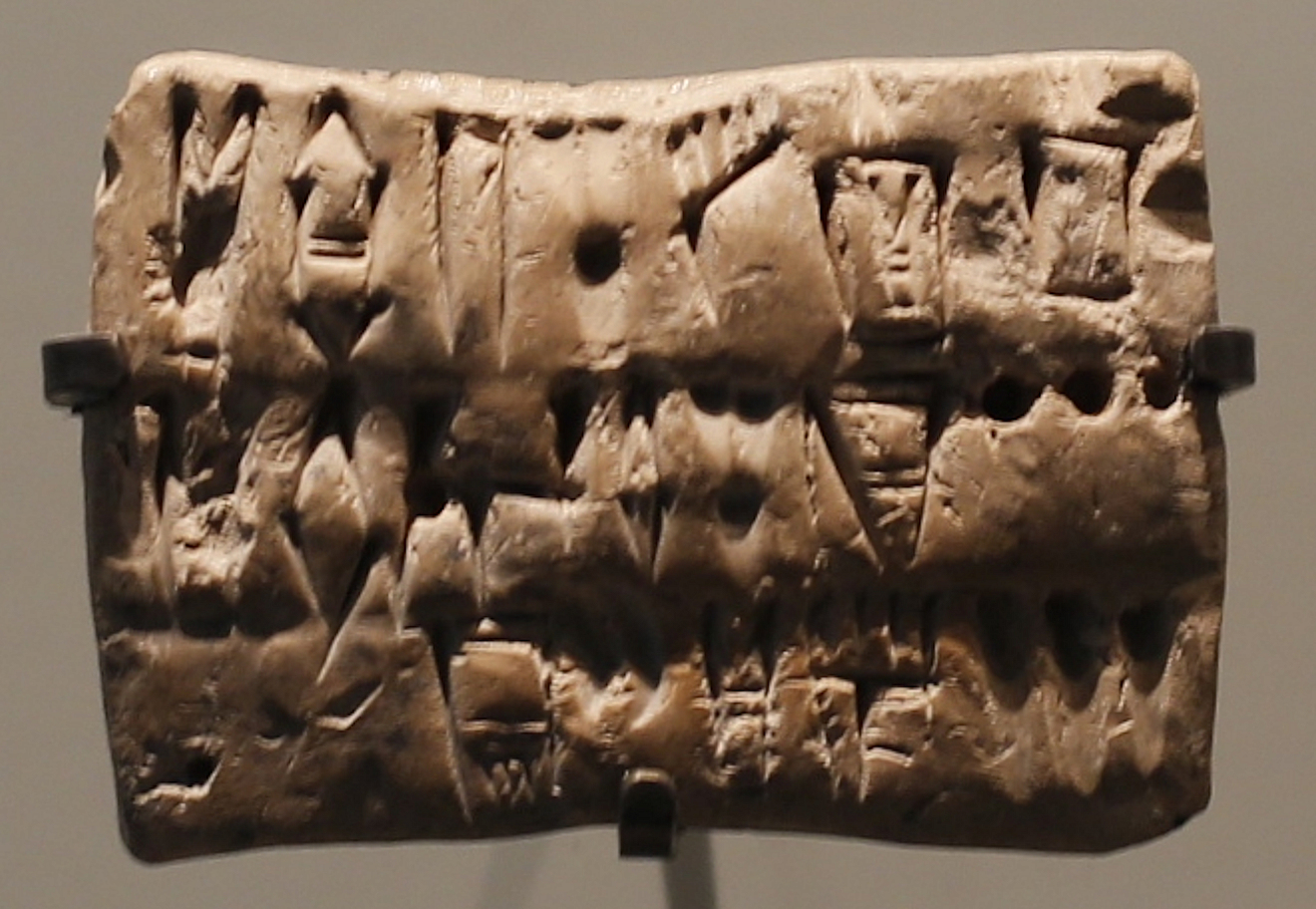
Proto-Elamite script

Byblos syllabary

=== East Asia ===
- Ba–Shu scripts – 5th to 4th century BCE.
- Khitan large script and Khitan small script – Khitan, 10th century; partially understood but not fully deciphered.
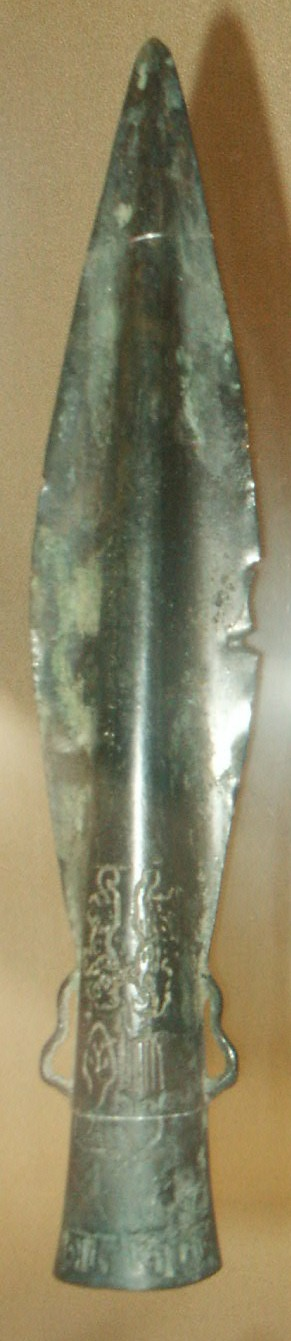
Ba script

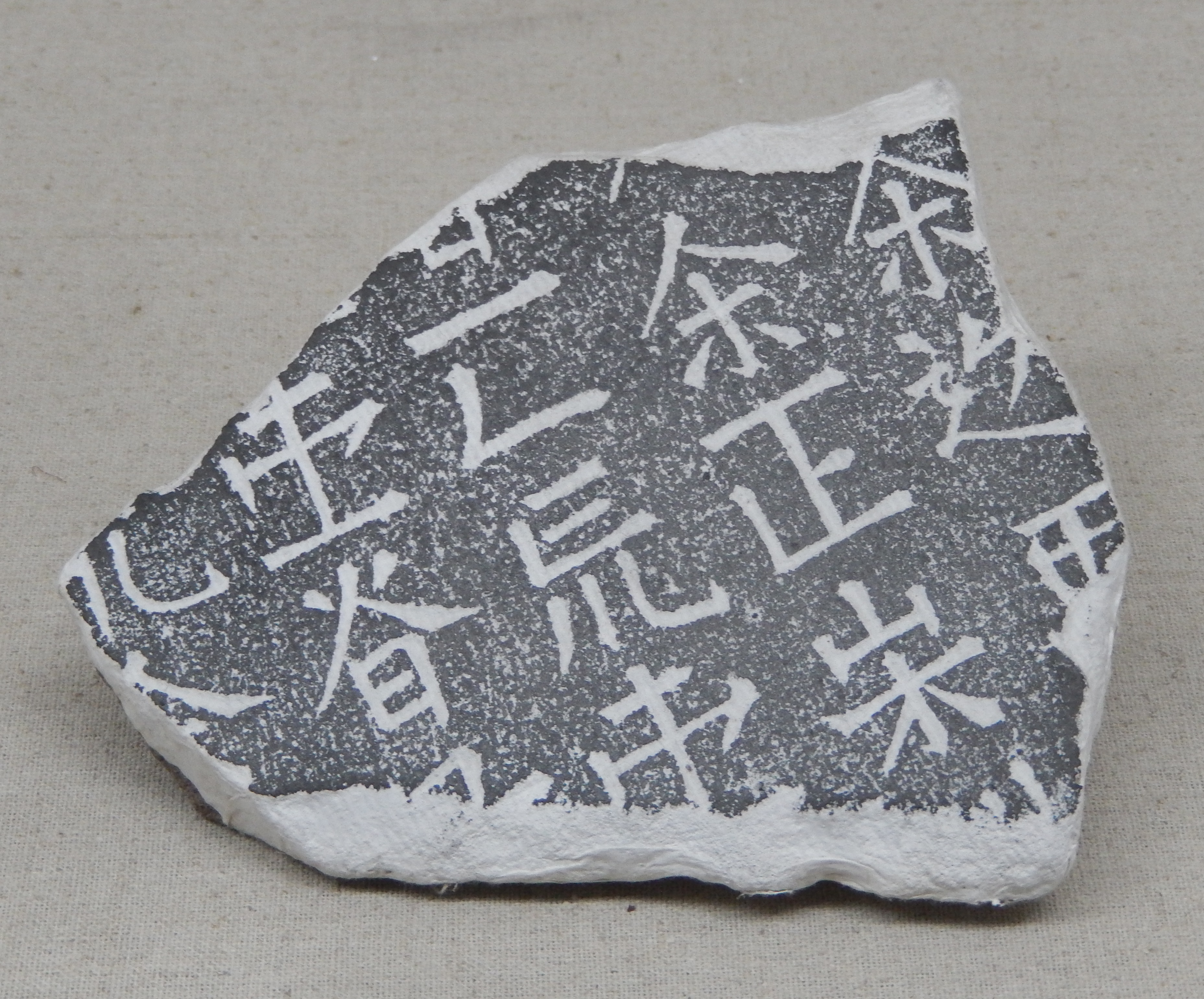
Khitan large script

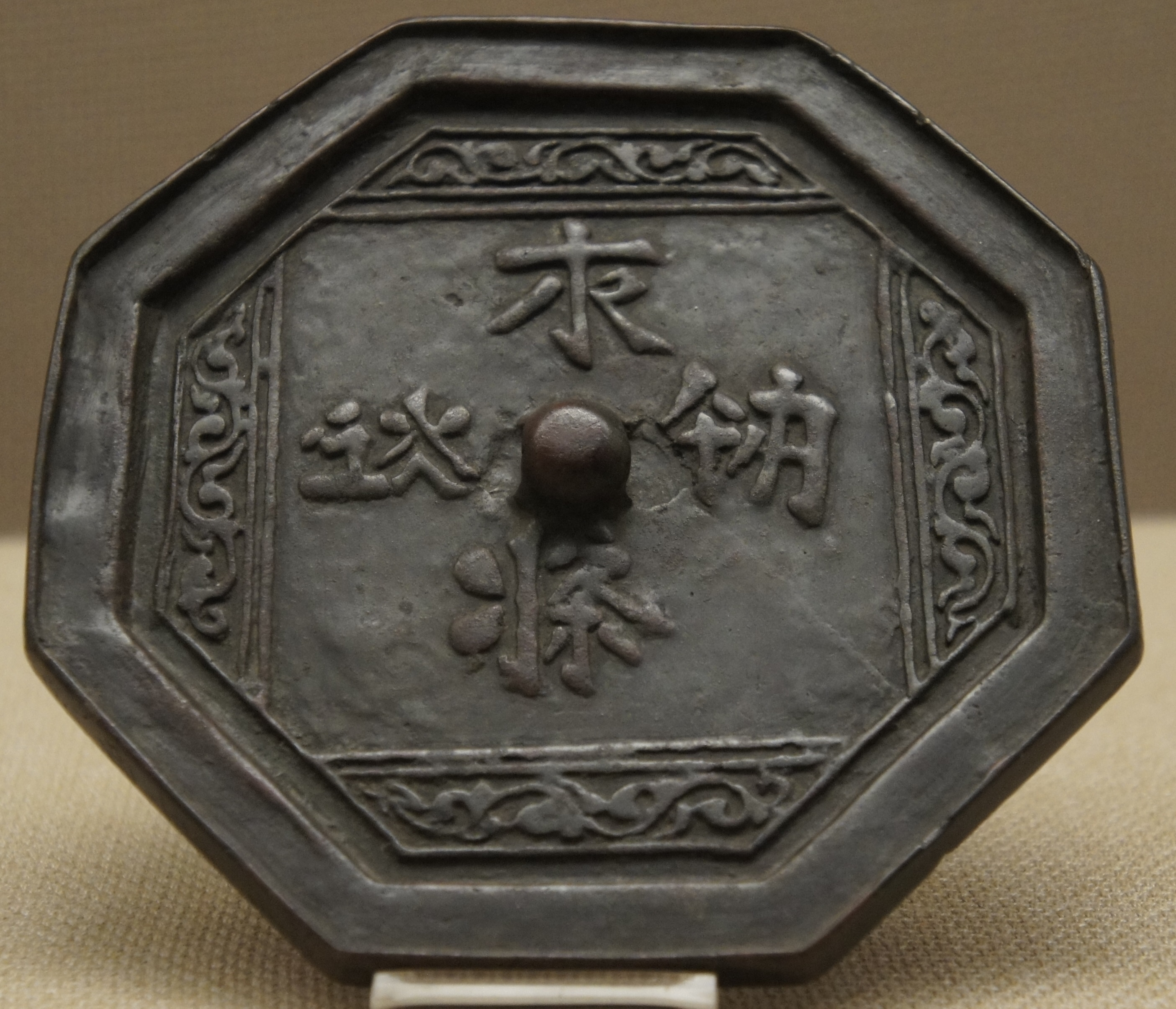
Khitan small script
- Singapore Stone – fragment of a sandstone slab inscribed with an ancient Southeast Asian script, possibly Old Javanese or Sanskrit; at least 13th century, possibly as early as 10th–11th century.
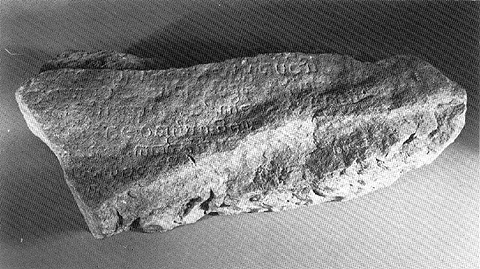
Singapore Stone

=== Central Asia ===
- Oxus script – c. 2200 BCE.
- Issyk inscription – Kazakhstan, c. 4th century BCE.
- Kushan script – c. 2nd century BCE – c. 7th century CE; partially deciphered, with recent proposals identifying a substantial portion of the sign inventory and phonetic values in the scholarly literature.
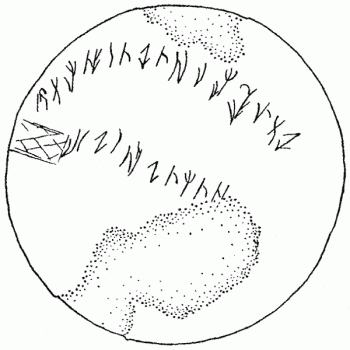
Issyk inscription

== European scripts ==
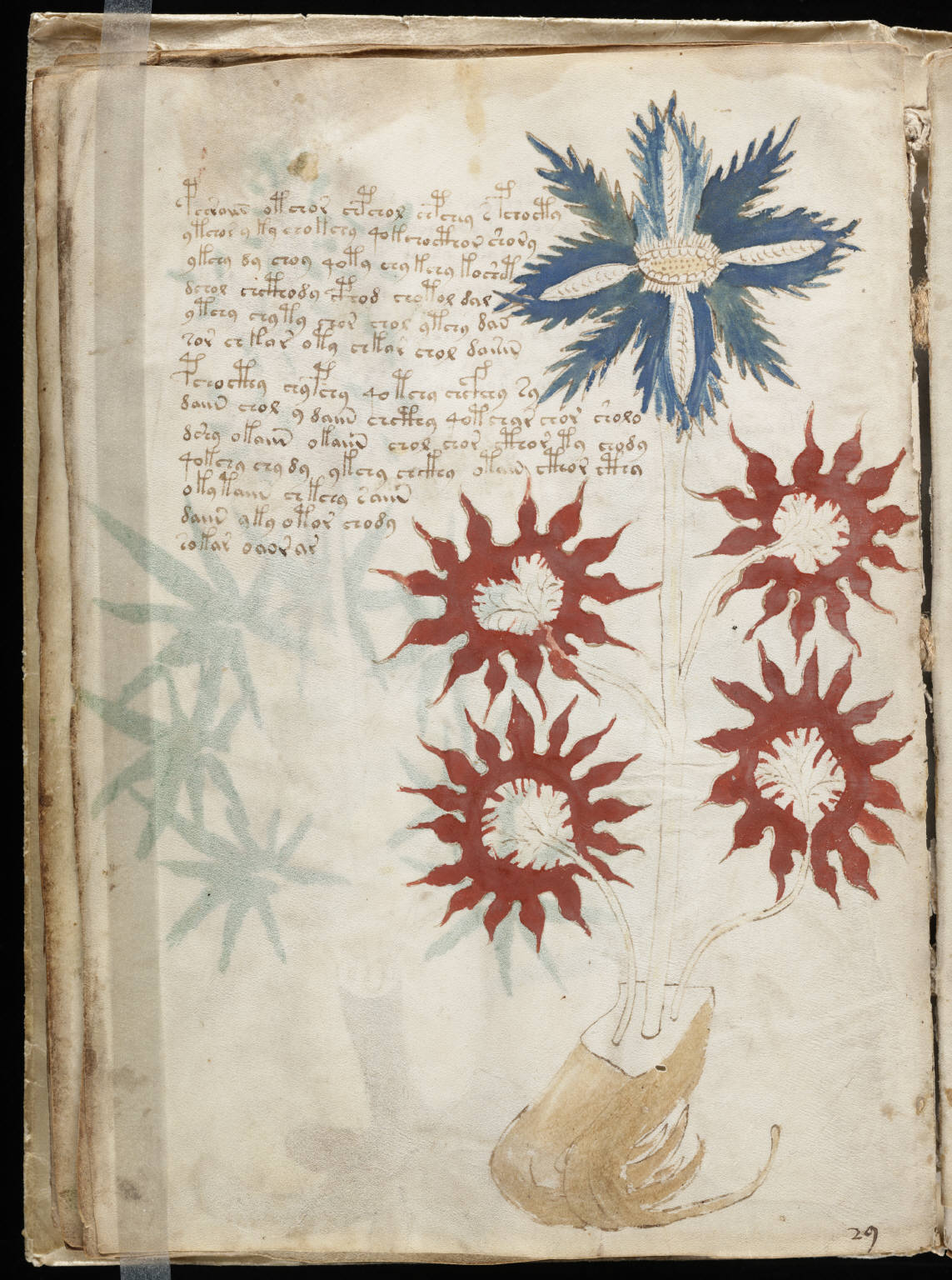
Page 32 of the Voynich manuscript, a medieval manuscript written with an undeciphered writing system

- Cretan hieroglyphs – c. 2100 BCE.
- Linear A – c. 1800 – c. 1450 BCE; the sign values are often transcribed using correspondences with Linear B, but the underlying language remains unknown and most texts are not understood.
- Phaistos Disc – c. 1850 – c. 1300 BCE; no consensus decipherment, though numerous proposals exist.
- Cypro-Minoan syllabary – c. 1550 BCE.
- Grakliani Hill script – Grakliani Hill, c. 11th – c. 10th century BCE.
- Paleohispanic scripts – several scripts are partly deciphered (sign values largely known), but many inscriptions and underlying languages remain only partly understood; inclusion and degree of decipherment vary by script.
  - Southwest Paleohispanic script – from c. 700 BCE.
- Sitovo inscription – c. 300 – c. 100 BCE.
- Alekanovo inscription – c. 10th – c. 11th century CE.
- Rohonc Codex – 17th–19th centuries.
- Voynich manuscript – radiocarbon dated (parchment) to the early 15th century.
- An inscription in the Pisa Baptistery – a short medieval religious inscription attested in Tuscany; the script/language and interpretation remain debated in the literature.
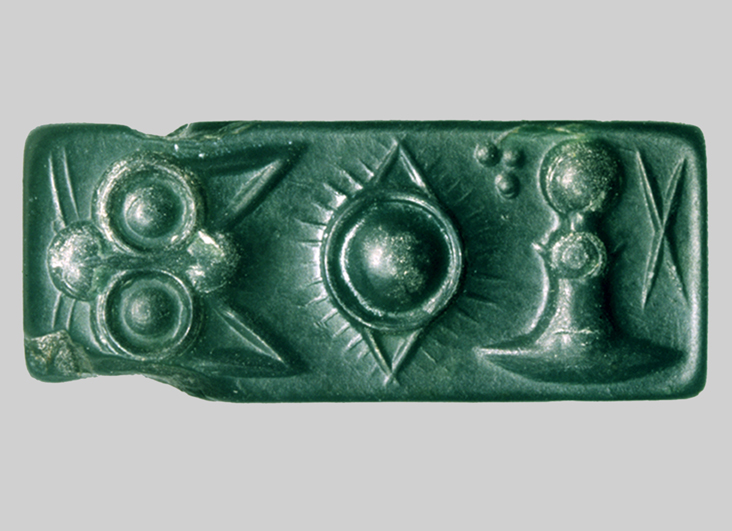
Cretan hieroglyphs

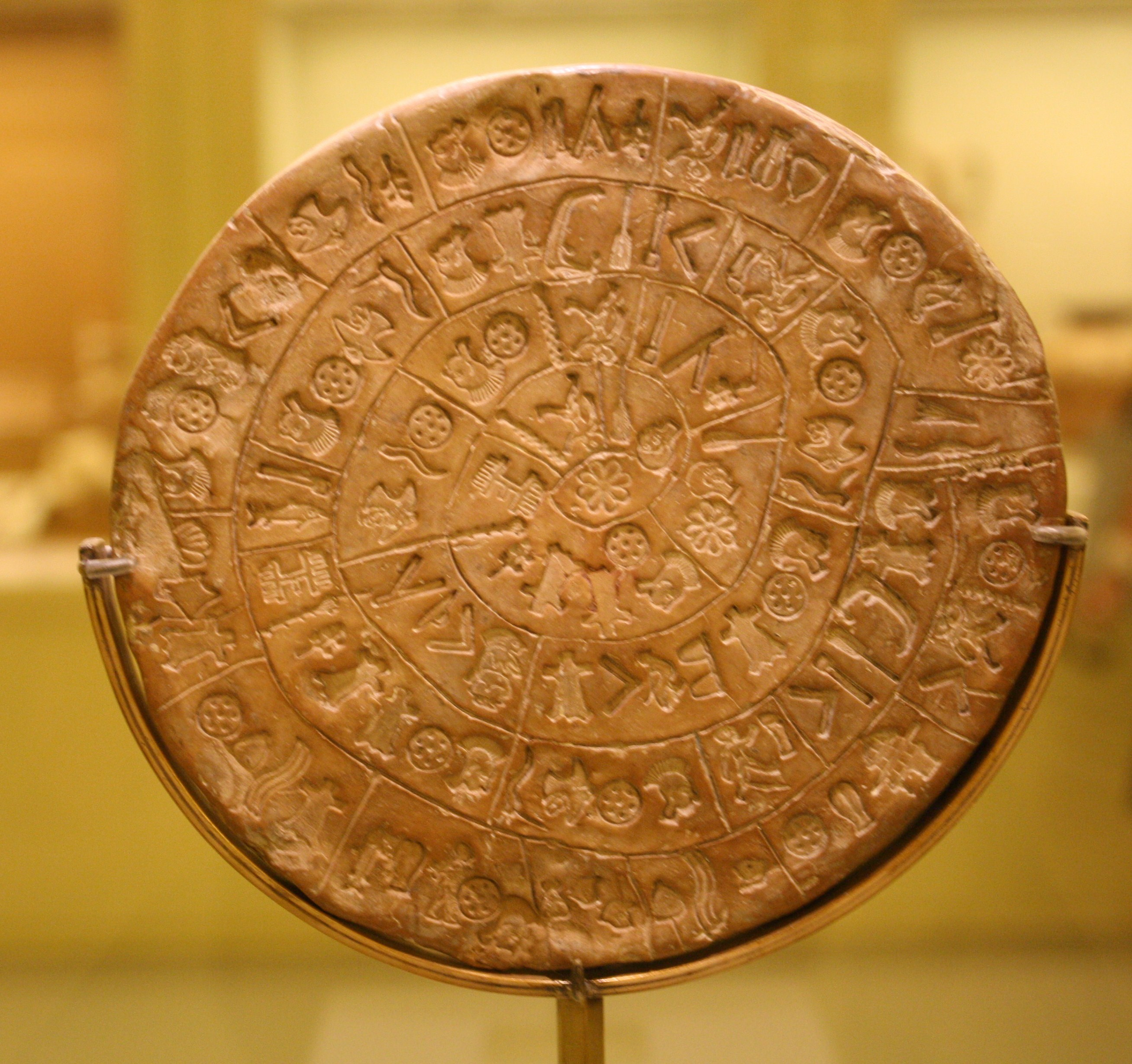
Phaistos disc

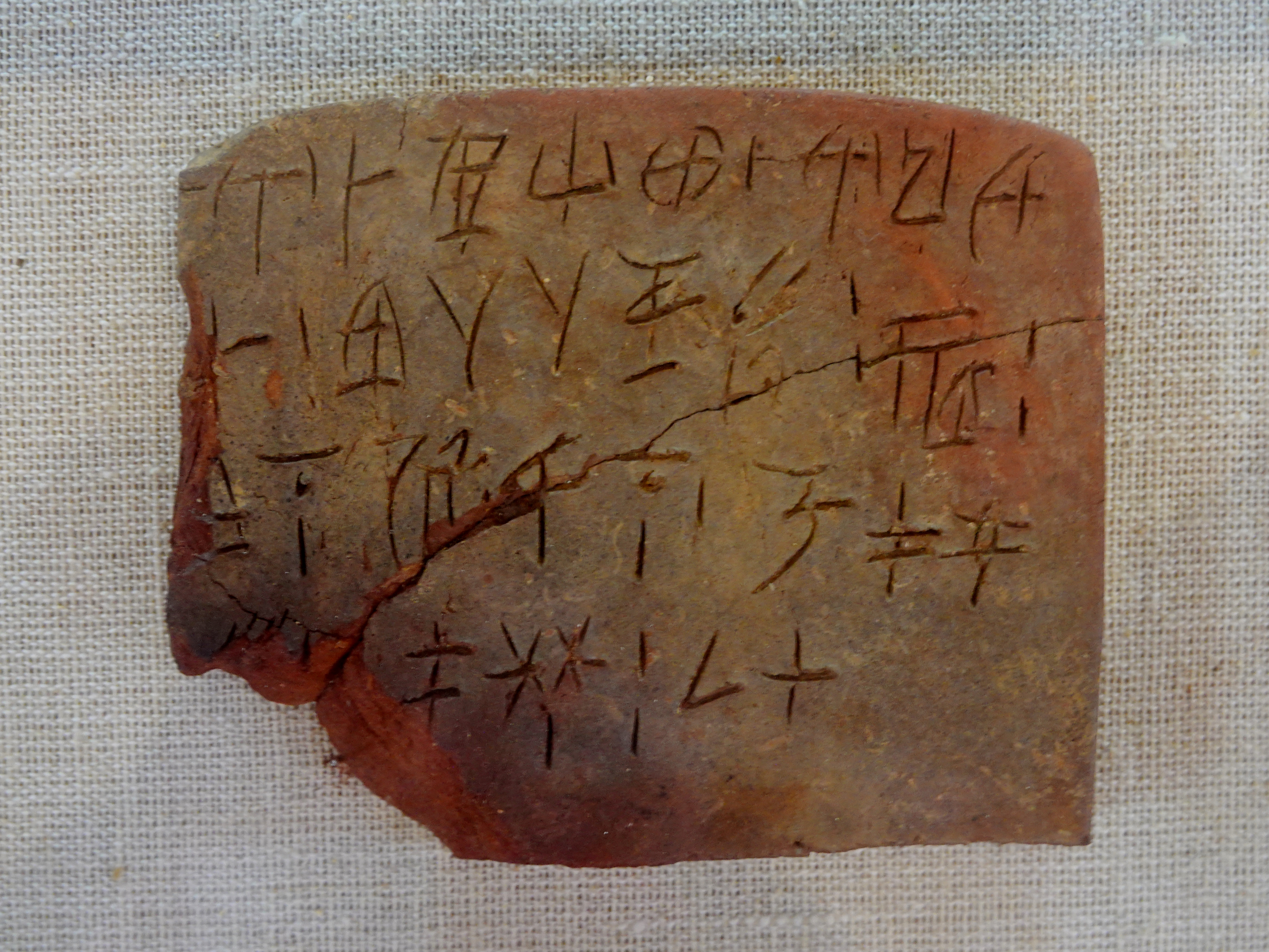
Linear A

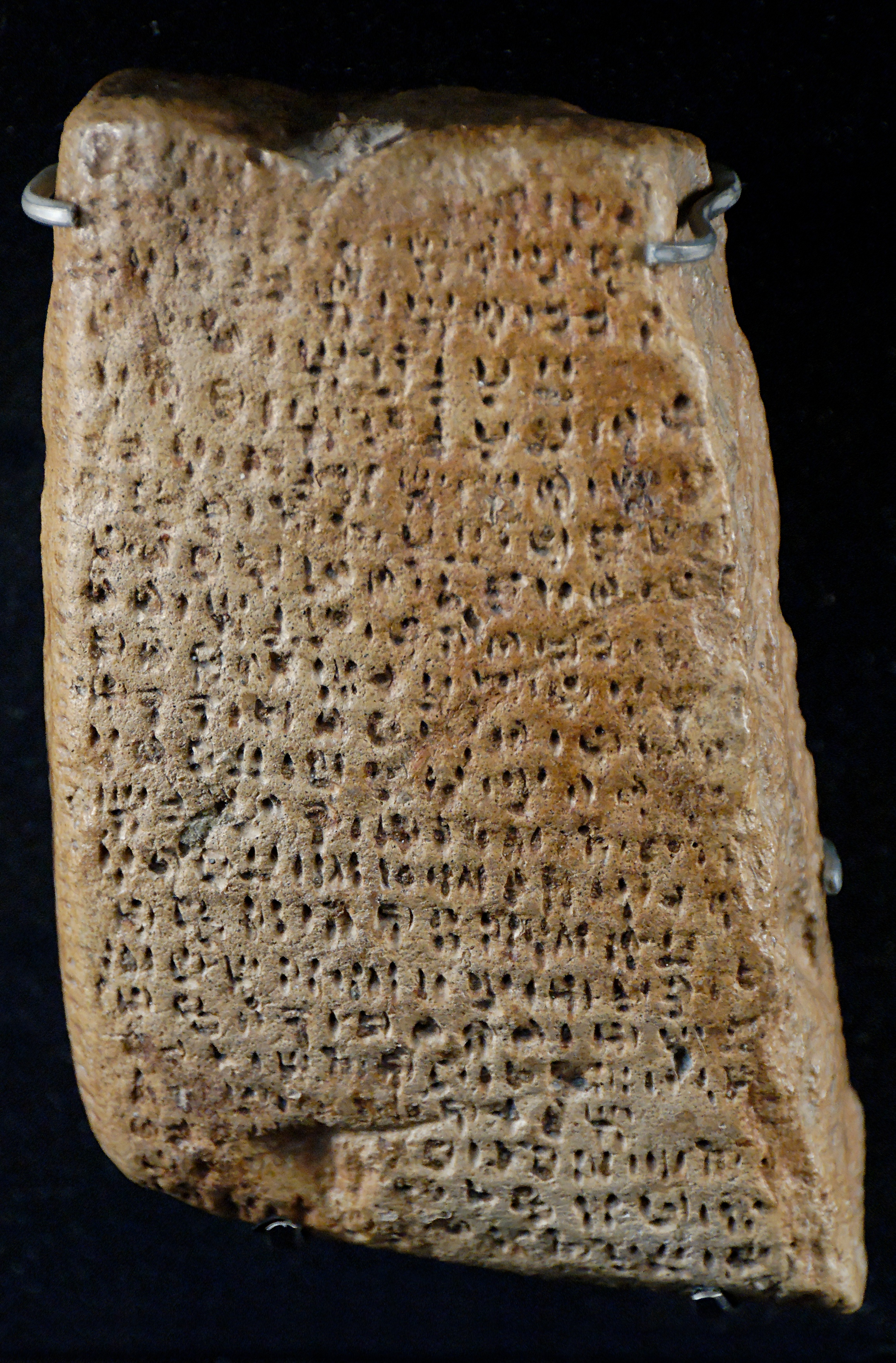
Cypro-Minoan syllabary

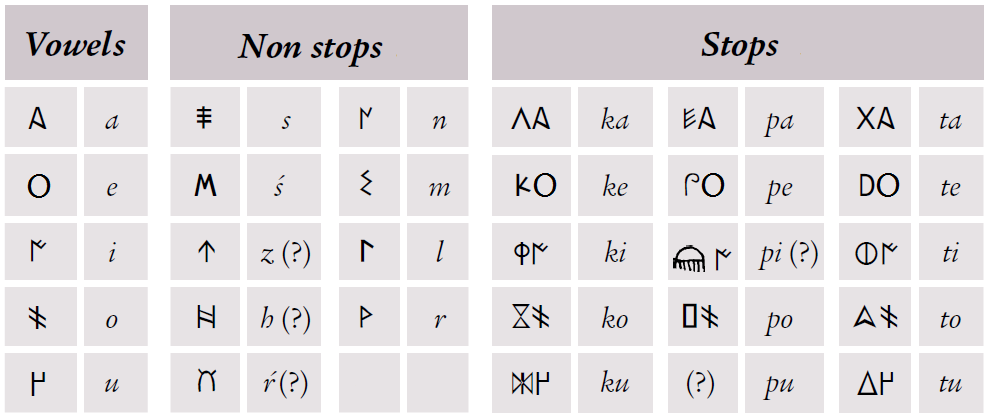
Southwest Paleohispanic script

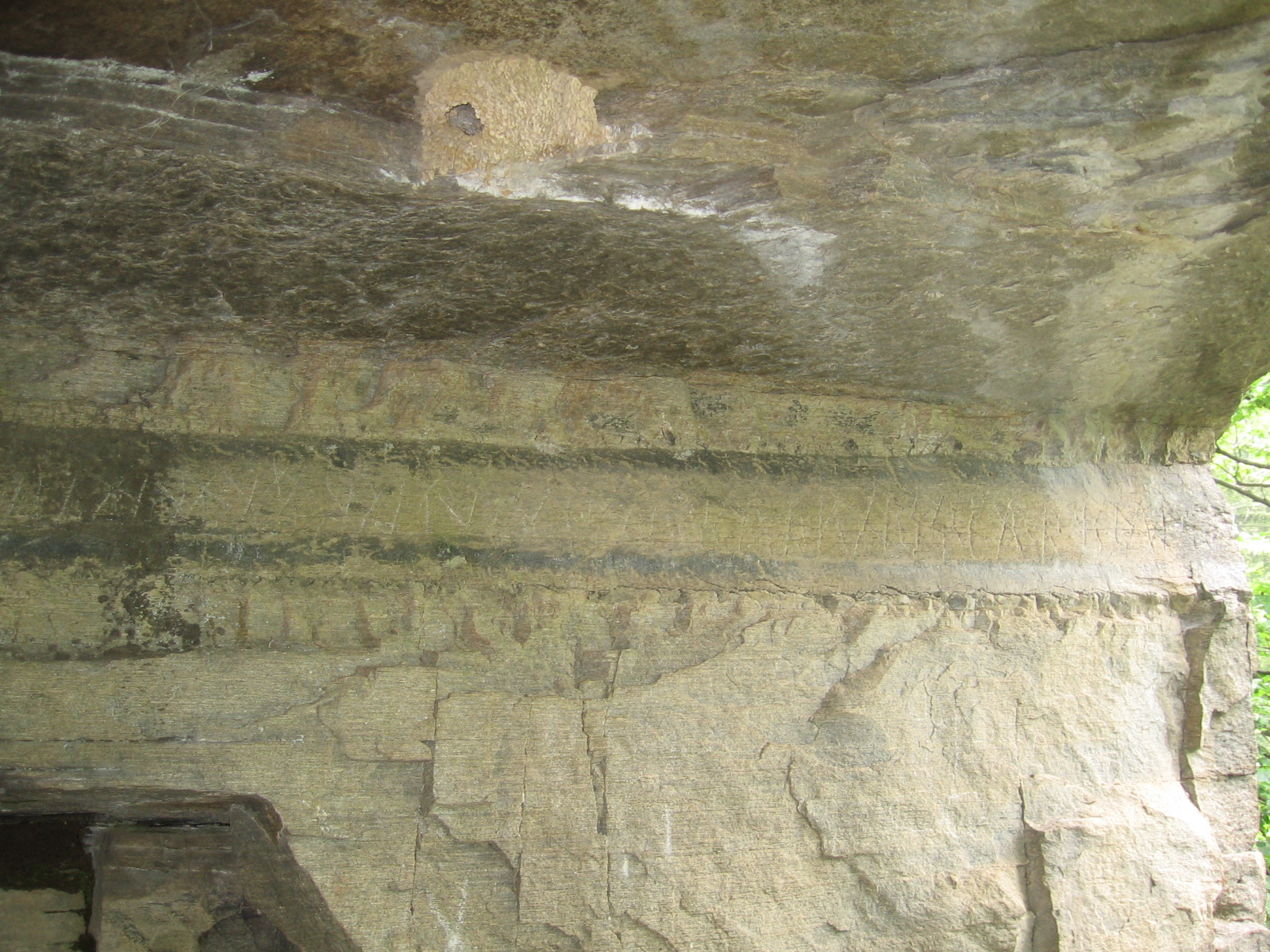
Sitovo inscription

== African scripts ==
=== North Africa ===
- The Starving of Saqqara – a privately held sculpture claimed to be ancient and bearing an unidentified inscription; provenance and authenticity have been questioned, and the markings are not securely established as an ancient writing system.
- Wadi el-Hol inscriptions – Egypt; early alphabetic inscriptions (often dated to the late Middle Kingdom, roughly early 2nd millennium BCE) with proposed readings but no universally accepted full decipherment; frequently discussed in relation to Proto-Sinaitic script.

=== Sub-Saharan Africa ===
- Eghap script – Cameroon, c. 1900; partially deciphered.
- Ancient inscriptions in Somalia – inscriptions reported on Taalo Tiiriyaad structures; independent archaeological verification and interpretation vary in the literature.

== American scripts ==
=== Andean region ===
- Quipu – Knotted-cord recording devices used in the Inca Empire and by several earlier Andean societies such as the Wari, with possible precursors in Paracas and Caral-Supe. Quipus continued to be used in certain regions during the early European colonial period and, in limited contexts, into the modern era. They are widely accepted as record-keeping devices, but whether they constitute writing (and what kind) remains debated. Some recent scholarship argues particular colonial-period quipu assemblages display features consistent with logosyllabic encoding and proposes tentative readings of specific elements. However, these claims remain controversial and do not have broad support. In another case, six early colonial quipus from the Santa Valley, Peru, have been correlated with a contemporaneous Spanish administrative document, making the connection a possible test case for linking quipus to alphabetic texts.
Quipu

=== Mesoamerica ===
- Olmec hieroglyphs – c. 1000 – c. 400 BCE; sometimes proposed as a "mother script" of other Mesoamerican writing systems, though the evidence and relationships remain debated.
- Zapotec hieroglyphs – c. 500 BCE – c. 800 CE; often described as logosyllabic, with varying degrees of interpretation.
- Ñuiñe hieroglyphs – c. 400 – c. 800 CE; similar to Zapotec and possibly an offshoot in the Mixteca Baja; often described as logosyllabic.
- Isthmian (Epi-Olmec) hieroglyphs – c. 400 BCE – c. 500 CE; partial readings have been proposed, but the overall decipherment remains disputed.
- Izapan hieroglyphs – Late Preclassic; often proposed as related to Isthmian traditions and later Lowland Maya developments; status remains uncertain.
- Teotihuacan hieroglyphs – c. 100 BCE – c. 700 CE; sometimes described as partially logosyllabary and partially a pictography; its relationship to earlier traditions is debated. Descendants include the Mixteca-Puebla Postclassic tradition.
- Classic Gulf Coast hieroglyphs – Early Classic to Early Postclassic; often discussed as related to central Mexican traditions.
- Cotzumalhuapa hieroglyphs – c. 0 – c. 1000 CE; sometimes discussed as influenced by Teotihuacan and Lowland Maya traditions; seemingly of autonomous local development, though ultimately related to all other mesoamerican writing systems. Interpretation remains limited.
- Epiclassic/Early Postclassic hieroglyphs of Xochicalco, Cacaxtla, Teotenango, Tula and Chichén Itzá – generally treated as part of broader regional glyphic traditions; many elements remain only partially understood. Intermediary between the Teotihuacan Classic Period hieroglyphs and their Mixteca-Puebla descendants of the Middle and Late Postclassic.

Many Mesoamerican glyphic traditions remain only partly understood, with the Classic/Lowland Maya script being the best-attested and most extensively deciphered. Other regional traditions (including those often grouped under "Mixteca-Puebla" or pictorial-historical codex traditions ultimately descended from the Teotihuacan tradition, most notably represented by Aztec hieroglyphs and Mixtec hieroglyphs) have been interpreted in the literature to varying extents, but are not universally recognised as a writing system, with some researchers considering it a mostly non-linguistic form of expression. Yet, in recent years new research has appeared confirming the existence of logosyllabic elements ("glyphs") intermixed with pictorial images. Nevertheless, new approaches have emerged, integrating the pictorial images as key in the linguistic interpretation of all elements in the codices, alongside the logograms and phonograms. These pictorial images would represent greater units of meaning, namely semantograms, also called embedded meanings, than a lexeme (logograms) or a sound (phonogram) which would become of paramount importance to achieve a coherent linguistic message in the codices. Thus, Mixteca-Puebla writing would constitute a form of non-linear writing.

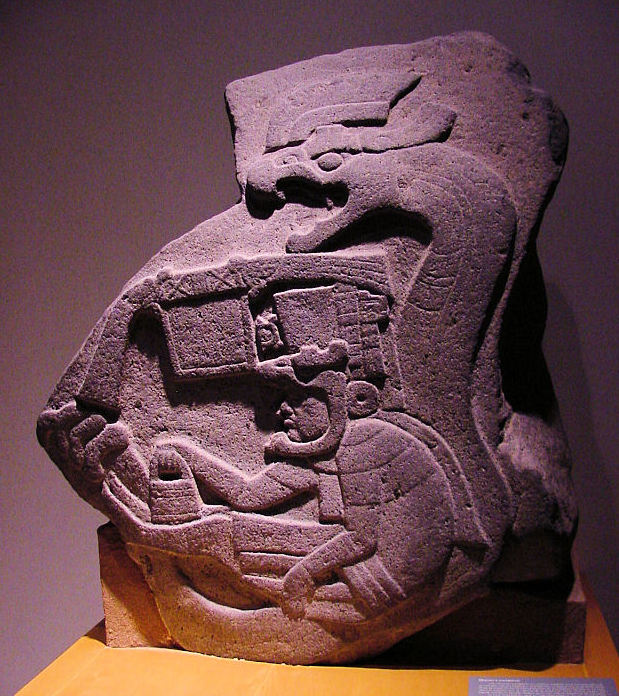
La Venta Stele 19

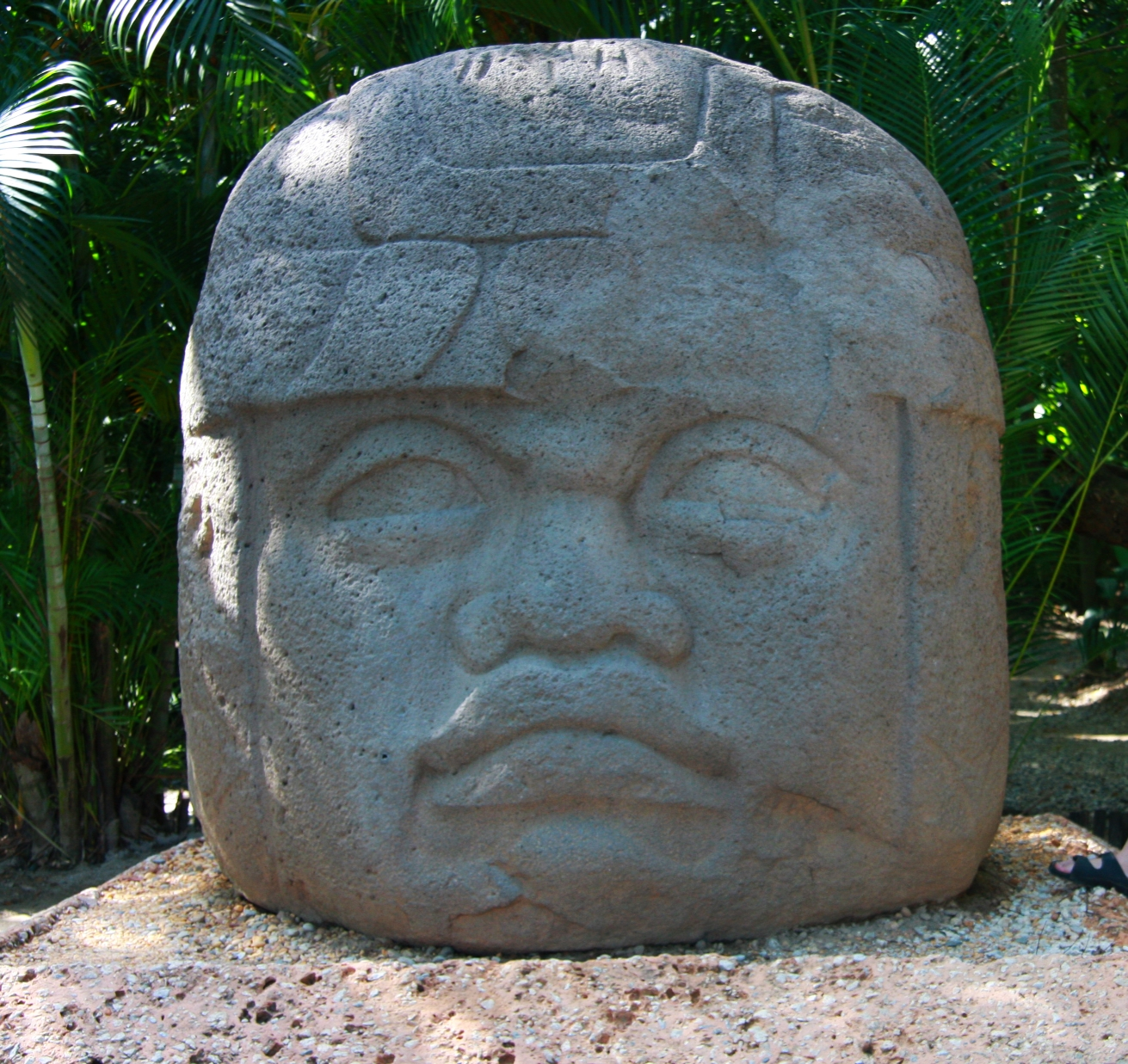
Olmec colossal head in La Venta (possible name glyph on forehead)

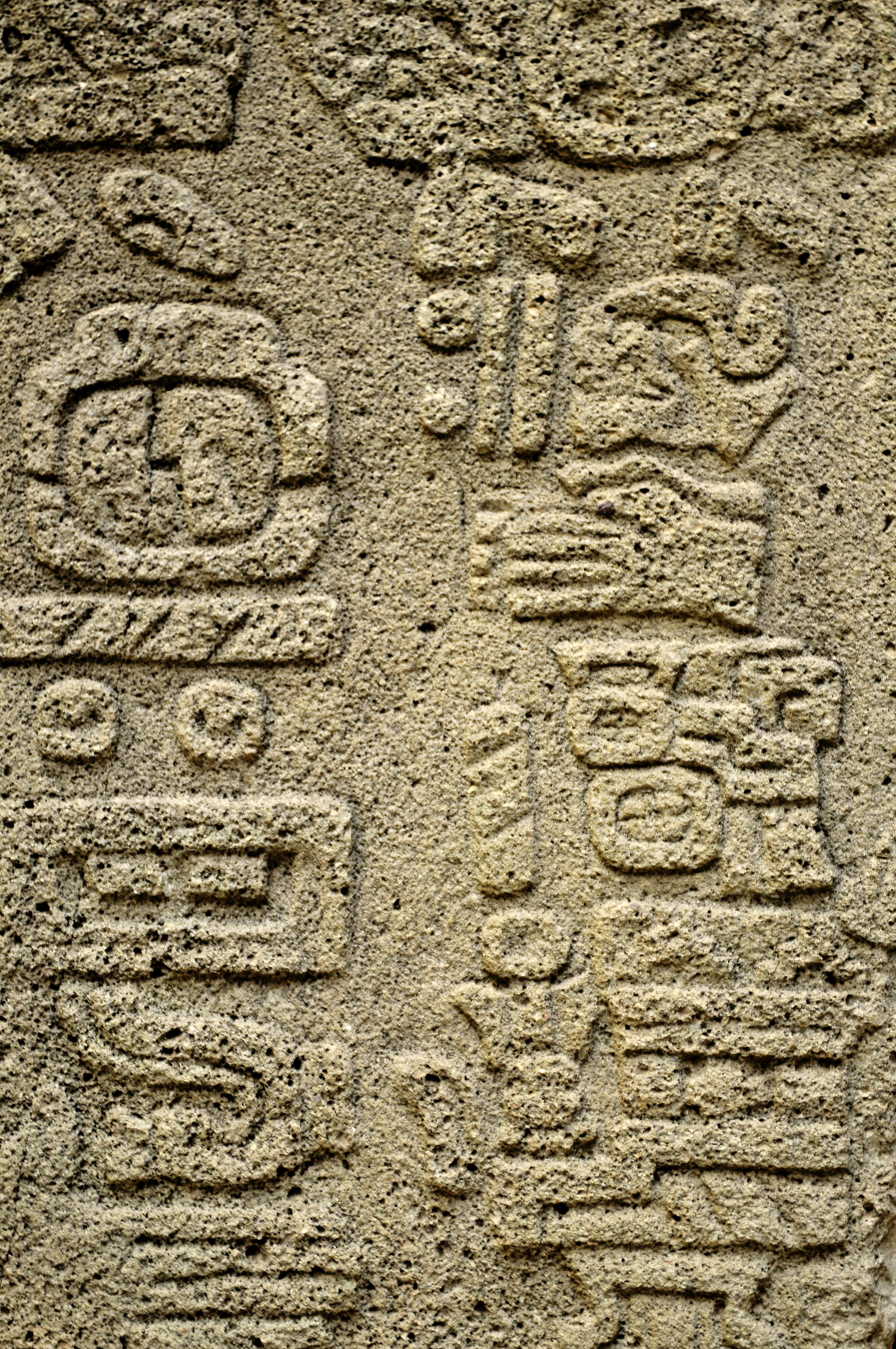
Zapotec script

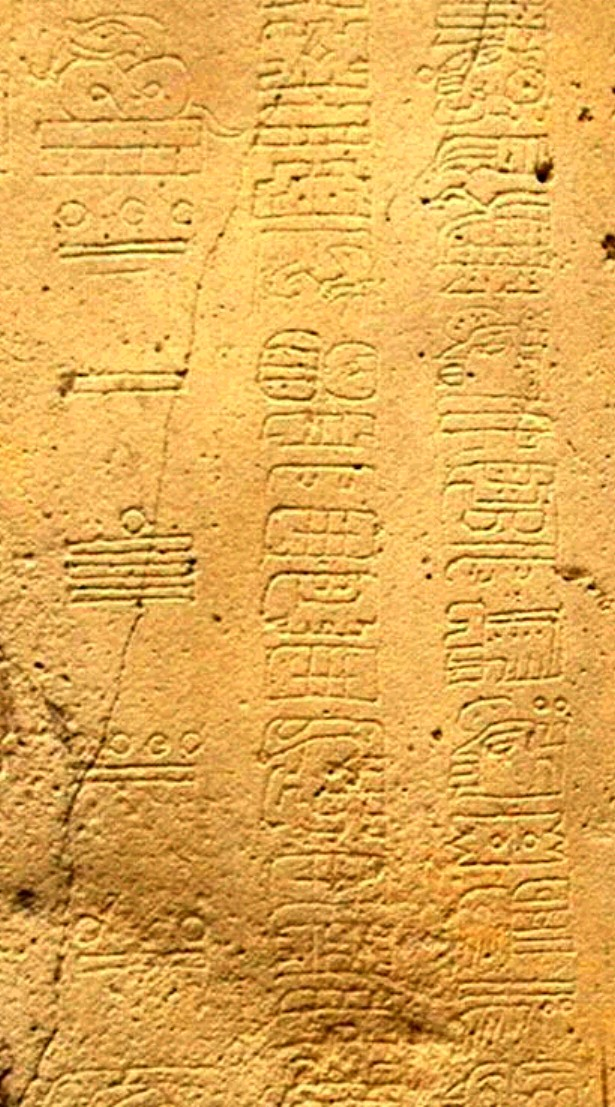
Isthmian/Epi-Olmec inscription

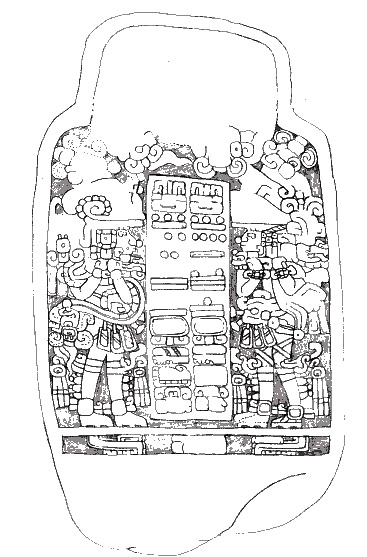
Izapan tradition (Tak'alik Ab'aj)

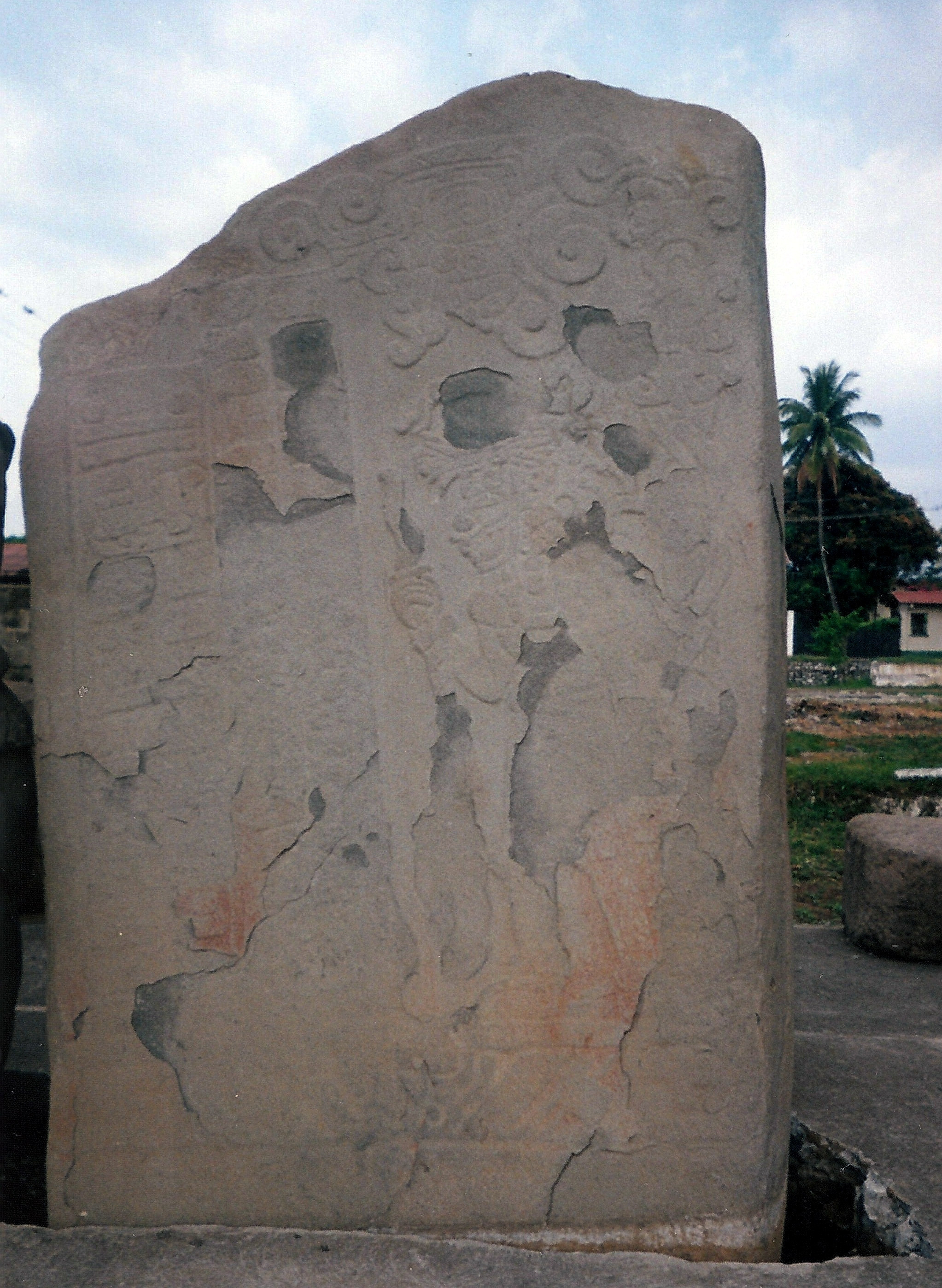
Cotzumalhuapa tradition

== Oceanian scripts ==
- Kōhau Rongorongo – Rapa Nui. Attested by the 19th century; often hypothesized to encode language but remains undeciphered.
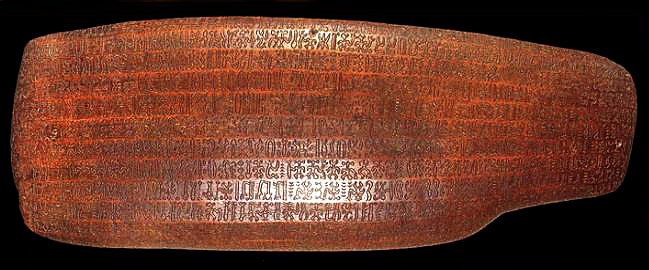
Kōhau Rongorongo

== Non-writing systems ==
False writing systems are glyphs that appear to be writing but are not. False writing cannot be deciphered because it has no stable semantic meaning. This includes many forms of asemic writing created for artistic purposes. A prominent example is the Codex Seraphinianus.

Another related concept is that of undeciphered cryptograms or cipher messages. These are not writing systems per se, but enciphered forms of texts written in known systems. Some have become famous and are listed in list of ciphertexts.
