= Jiahu symbols =

Ancient carvings on artifacts in China

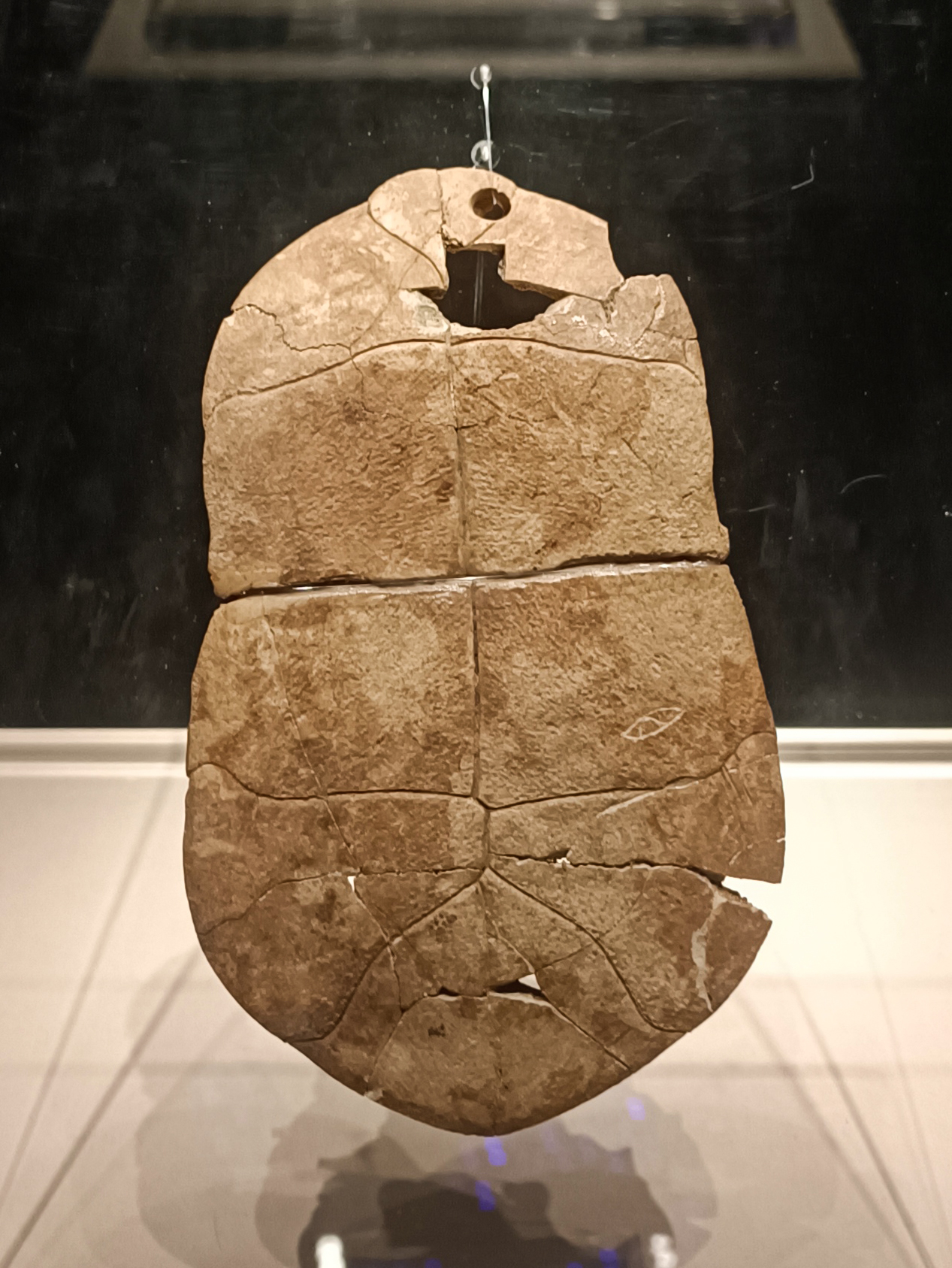
Turtle plastron from Jiahu inscribed with an eye-like symbol

Example of Jiahu symbols

The Jiahu symbols (simplified Chinese: 贾湖契刻符号; traditional Chinese: 賈湖契刻符號; pinyin: Jiǎhú qìkè fúhào) comprise a corpus of markings on prehistoric artifacts found in Jiahu, a Neolithic site of Peiligang culture in Henan, China. The Jiahu symbols are dated to around 6000 BC.

The site was excavated in 1989. Although at first a total of 17 groups of symbols were identified, intensive scrutiny has found there to be only 11 definitely incised signs, of which 9 were incised on tortoise shells and an additional 2 on bone. The archaeologists who made the original finds believed the markings to be similar in form to some characters used in the much later oracle bone script (e.g., similar markings of 目 'eye', 日 'sun; day'), but most doubt that the markings represent systematic writing. A 2003 report in Antiquity interpreted them "not as writing itself, but as features of a lengthy period of sign-use which led eventually to a fully-fledged system of writing". The earliest known body of writing in the oracle bone script dates much later to the reign of the late Shang dynasty king Wu Ding, which started in about c. 1250 BC or 1200 BC.

== Interpretation as writing ==
There is no consensus on the nature of the Jiahu signs. Some researchers assume this to be a very early writing system, based on the resemblance of a few symbols to much later historic scripts and their placement (turtle shells and bones) hinting at the divination practices of the Late Shang dynasty. Some shells exhibit holes similar to the ones used in the Shang oracle bones to insert heat sources, causing cracking interpreted by diviners. The opponents point to the signs being too primitive and inconsistent to be part of a writing system. There is also a possibility of some signs being a result of unintentional damage or used as workshop marks.

== Recent findings ==
In 2006, pottery fragments covered with characters dating back 4,500 years were found in Pingliangtai.

In 2007, Chinese archaeologists reported that the Damaidi inscriptions carved on rock walls in Ningxia, discovered in the 1980s, are 8,000 years old and can be considered ancient forms of modern characters.

== See also ==
- Gudi (instrument) – Oldest musical instrument discovered in China
- Neolithic signs in China – Markings found at Neolithic sites in China
- Undeciphered writing systems – Writing systems that are yet to be understood
- Vinča symbols – Symbols found upon Vinča culture artifacts

== Sources ==
- Demattè, Paola (2022). "Early and Middle Neolithic Signs to the Fourth Millennium BCE". The Origins of Chinese Writing. Oxford University Press. pp. 99–148. doi:10.1093/oso/9780197635766.003.0005. ISBN 9780197635766.
