= Ancient inscriptions in Somalia =

Undeciphered writing systems

In an 1878 report to the Royal Geographical Society of Great Britain, Johann Maria Hildebrandt noted upon visiting the area that "we know from ancient authors that these districts, at present so desert, were formerly populous and civilised[...] I also discovered ancient ruins and rock-inscriptions both in pictures and characters[...] These have hitherto not been deciphered." These etchings are found together with paintings, which are estimated to be 2,500 years old.

Encyclopedias from ca. 1900 note that ancient tombs, pyramidal structures, ruined towns, and stone walls found in Somalia, such as the Wargaade Wall, are evidence of an old civilization in the Somali peninsula that predates Islam.

Some of the inscriptions are written in a script called "Sumado" or "Summadu".

== Findings ==
Archaeological sites where ancient inscriptions have been found on cave paintings include Godka Xararka and Qubiyaaley in Las Anod District, and Hilayom, Karin and Dhalanle in Las Khoray District.

According to the Ministry of Information and National Guidance of Somalia, inscriptions can be found on various old Taalo Tiiriyaad structures. These are enormous stone mounds found especially in northeastern Somalia. Among the main sites where these Taalo are located are Xabaalo Ambiyad in Alula District, Baar Madhere in Beledweyne District, and Harti Yimid in Las Anod District.

In 2005, at Laas Ga'al, more rock etchings were discovered.

== See also ==
- Architecture of Somalia
- Somali National Academy of Culture
- Undeciphered scripts
