= Issyk inscription =

Undeciphered archaeological text

Issyk inscription

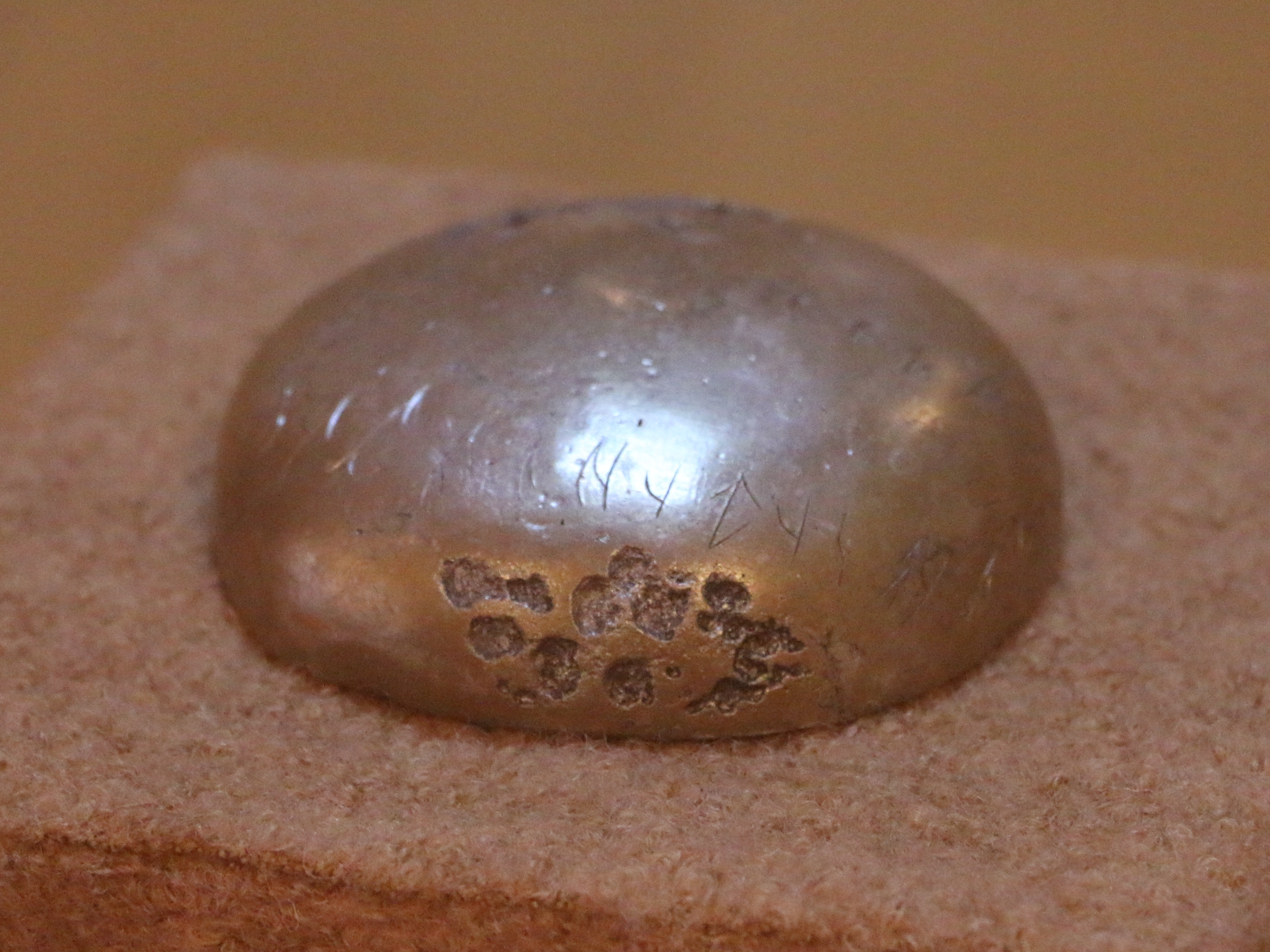
Issyk dish with inscription

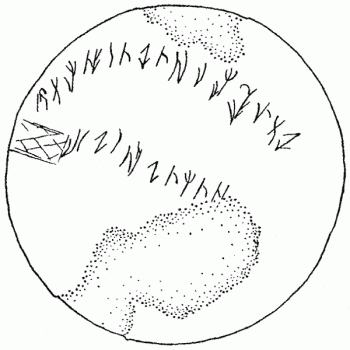
Drawing of the Issyk inscription

The Issyk inscription is a yet undeciphered text, possibly in the Kushan script, found in 1969 on a silver bowl in Issyk kurgan in Kazakhstan, dated to the 4th century BC. The context of the burial gifts indicates that it may belong to Saka tribes.

== Content ==
The Issyk inscription is not yet certainly deciphered, and is probably in a Scythian dialect, constituting one of very few autochthonous epigraphic traces of that language. Various possible identifications of the script have been proposed.

The inscription was likely used to record a previously unknown Middle Iranian language spoken in the Kushan Empire. While some have hypothesized the script was used to record a Turkic or Mongolic language, these hypotheses can be reasonably excluded due to the lack of linguistic evidence for such languages in the area. Various possible identifications of the script have been proposed.

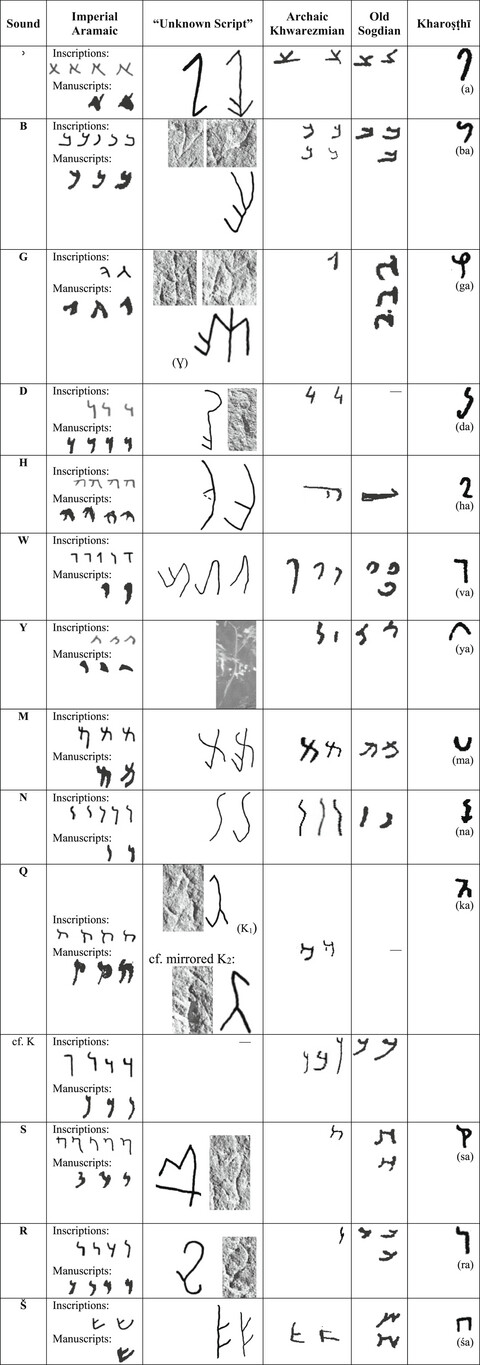
Table comparing text found in the Dašt-i Nāwur III inscription and an inscription found in the Almosi Gorge with the Imperial Aramaic script

In 1992, János Harmatta, using the Kharoṣṭhī script, identified the language as a Khotanese Saka dialect spoken by the Kushans, tentatively translating:

Khotanese Saka translation
Line	Transliteration	English translation
1	za(ṃ)-ri ko-la(ṃ) mi(ṃ)-vaṃ vaṃ-va pa-zaṃ pa-na de-ka mi(ṃ)-ri-to	The vessel should hold wine of grapes, added cooked food, so much, to the mortal,
2	ña-ka mi pa-zaṃ vaṃ-va va-za(ṃ)-na vaṃ.	then added cooked fresh butter on

A 2023 analysis by Bonmann et al. identifies the Issyk inscription's language with a previously unknown branch of Eastern Iranian, particularly a language that "may turn out [...] to be a missing link between Bactrian, Sogdian, the Saka languages, Old Ossetic/Alanic and ‘Old Steppe Iranian’ (and perhaps individual modern Iranian languages)". They also propose referring to the now-identified script as the "(Issyk-)Kushan script".

Additionally, they hypothesize that the Kushan script was derived from the Aramaic alphabet without the Kharoṣṭhī script as an intermediary, functioning like an Indic alphasyllabary in which each letter has a basic vocalic value; the vowel quality or quantity can then be changed with added strokes. The similarities between Aramaic and the unknown Kushan script are summarized in the right table.

== Photos of the inscription ==
Inscription close up, right side

Inscription close up, left side

== See also ==
- Nestor's Cup and Duenos inscription for other ancient inscriptions on vessels that concern the vessel itself
- Undeciphered writing systems
