= Kushan script =

Partially deciphered writing system

- Script type: Abugida
- Period: 600–200 BCE to 700 CE
- Direction: Right-to-left script

Related scripts
- Parent systems: Egyptian: Proto-Sinaitic; Phoenician; Aramaic ?; Kushan script

The Kushan script (écriture inconnue in French, neizvestnoe pis’mo in Russian, both meaning unknown lettering) is a partially deciphered writing system, an abugida, which is written from right to left. The script was used in parts of Central Asia between 600 and 200 BCE (depending on the dating of the Issyk inscription) and 700 CE, including the Kushan Empire, along with Greek and Kharosthi scripts, associated with the Dà Yuèzhī of the Eurasian Steppe in ancient Bactria. Its inscriptions were discovered by archaeologists in the 1950s. Textual remnants consist of cave wall carvings and painted ceramics. Most of what was written was probably recorded on palm leaves or birch bark which had decomposed.

A 2023 analysis by Bonmann et al. hypothesized that the language recorded in the script was of (previously unknown) Middle Iranian type. However, newer analysis by Nicholas Sims-Williams (2025) and Halfmann et al. (2026) concluded that the language was Bactrian, recorded in both Greek and Kushan scripts in the inscription.

The script comprises less than 30 signs, and likely around 25. It is possibly an Imperial Aramaic-derived script, that has been modified with diacritics.

== Decipherment attempts ==
Several decipherment attempts were made, mostly focusing on the oldest instance of the script, the Issyk inscription, without success. The partial decipherment was announced on 1 March 2023 by a team at the University of Cologne, when the consonant values of 15 signs, 2 ligatures, and 4 vowel diacritics had been determined. The corpus is primarily short inscriptions that originate from the territory of present-day Tajikistan, Afghanistan, and Uzbekistan. A significant discovery that led to progress on decipherment was a bilingual carving found in the Almosi Gorge in northwestern Tajikistan, which included a section in the Bactrian language and ancient Greek writing. It was used in addition to the trilingual Gandhari-Bactrian-Kushan inscription discovered in the 1960s at Dašt-i Nāwur, Mount Qarabayu in Afghanistan, as the name of emperor Vima Takto and his title King of Kings appears in both texts.

Vladimir Livshits originally pointed out that the Issyk inscription bears a resemblance to later, similarly undeciphered inscriptions from the Kushan Empire, dated to the 2nd-3rd centuries CE. This includes texts found at Dašt-i Nāwur, Surkh Kotal, Al-Khanoum, and seven other short inscriptions. He and Edvard Rtveladze suggested calling it the Saka script, because it apparently appeared in the time of the Saka and was used by ones that joined the Yuezhi to establish the Kushan Empire. Harmatta proposed a decipherement in 1999 based on this hypothesis.

However, due to some deviations, Gérard Fussman hypothesised that they could be attributed to several writing systems. The Sakan hypothesis was also met with skepticism due to the possibility that the Issyk inscription originates from Bactria via trade or loot. As of 2014, the majority of experts considered the script to be undeciphered.

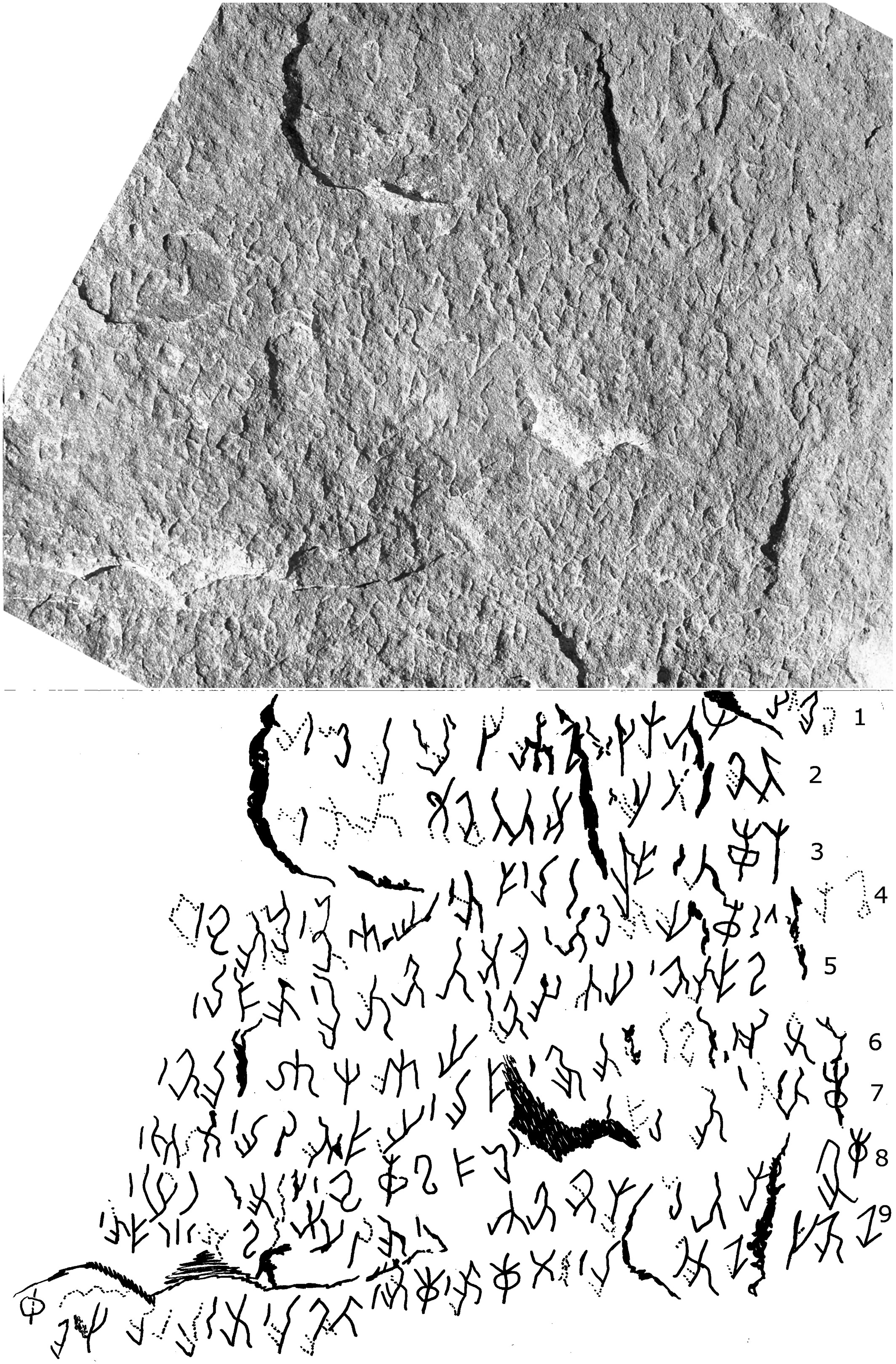
Photo of the Dašt-i Nāwur inscription and tracing of inscription beneath.

Some researchers have claimed similarities with the Orkhon runes and tried to read them as inscriptions in Old Turkic. However, due to the attempts all widely varying in their attempted decipherments, they have not been considered successful. Liwshits claimed that this is because they shared a common origin in the Imperial Aramaic script. A 2023 analysis by Bonmann et al., hypothesized that the Kushan script recorded a new sub-branch of the Eastern Iranian languages, particularly a language "situated in between Bactrian-, Sogdian-, Saka- and Old Steppe Iranian". They also argue "since it is not an ‘unknown script’ anymore, we suggest to call the writing system ‘(Issyk-)Kushan script’ from now on". Newer studies since then have identified the language as being Bactrian.

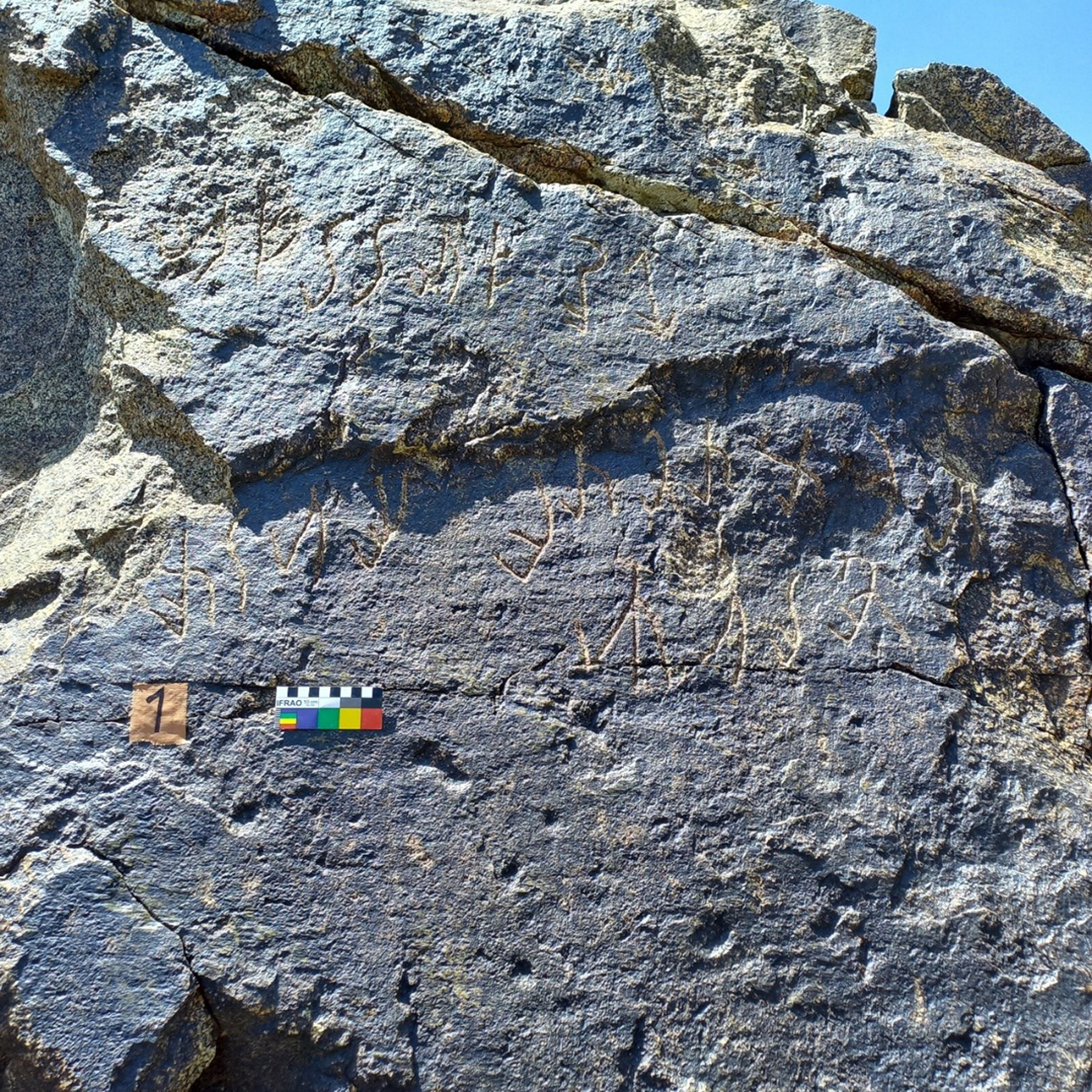
Almosi Gorge, Stone 1, inscription in the unknown Kushan script (Photograph: Bobomullo Bobomulloev)

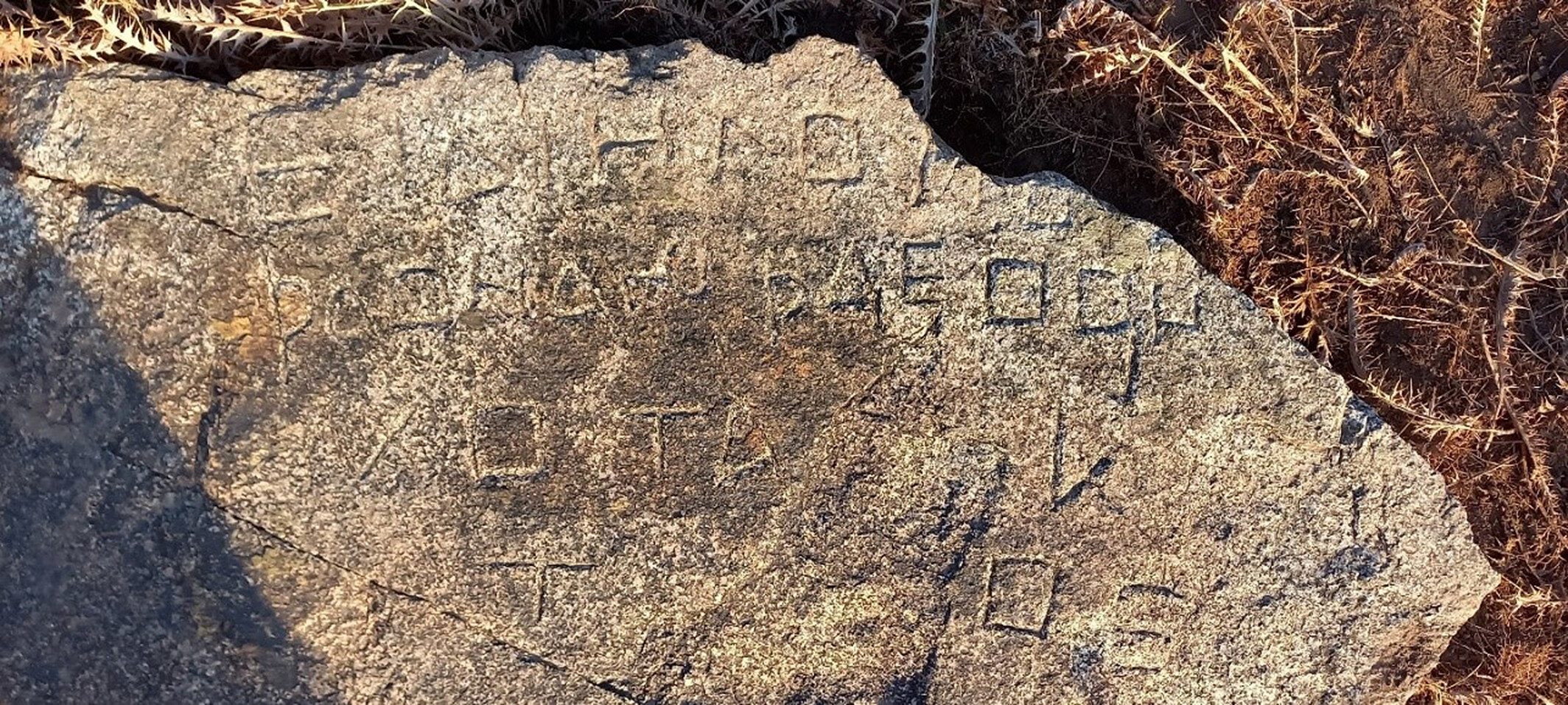
Almosi Gorge, Stone 3, Bactrian inscription (Photograph: Muhsin Bobomulloev)

== Bonmann's analysis ==
Bonmann's analysis primarily focuses on the trilingual Dašt-i Nāwur inscription and bilingual carving found in the Almosi Gorge, using the phrase "king of kings" to find graphemic minimal pairs within the unknown text from a particular language hypothesized to be represented. Following this, a step-by-step phonetic substitution with expected names and then parallel sections was performed.

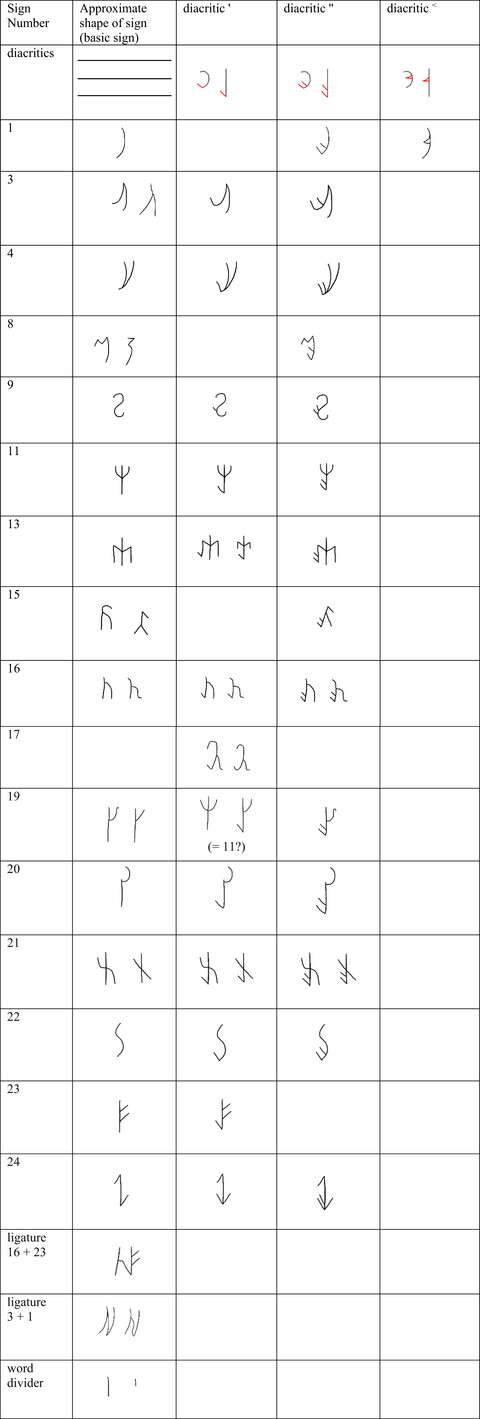
The set of characters in the unknown Kushan script identified by Bonmann et al. 2023.

Initially, Bonmann identifies 25-30 independent signs in the writing system (shown right), indicating that the script does not represent a logo-syllabic system. The hypothesis is rather that the script represents an Indic-type alphasyllabary, with each letter having the basic vocalic value /a/; the vowel quality or quantity can then be changed with additional strokes.

In both the DN (Dašt-i Nāwur inscription) and AG (Almosi Gorge) inscriptions, the phrase "king of kings" followed by the name Vema Takhtu occurs in the Bactrian sections. Given this co-occurrence, Bonmann's decipherment is based on the hypothesis that this phrase occurs in the sections of each inscription written in the Kushan script. Through a distributional analysis, a parallel sequence was found between DN III and AG I.

Bonmann's decipherment begins initially with noticing a sequence in line 1 of AG I with repeating characters.

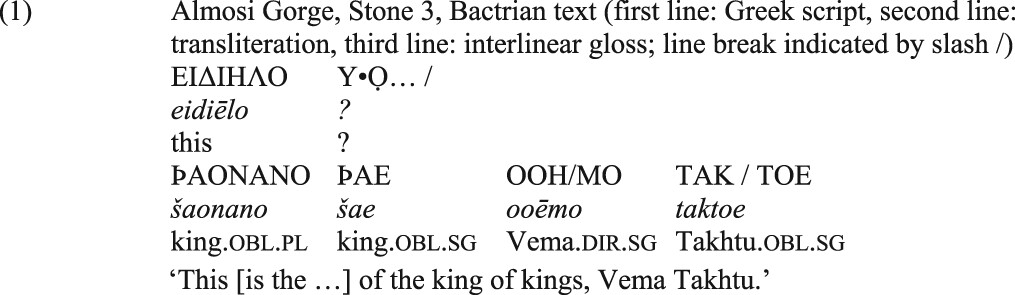
Gloss of a section of the Bactrian inscription on AG Stone 3

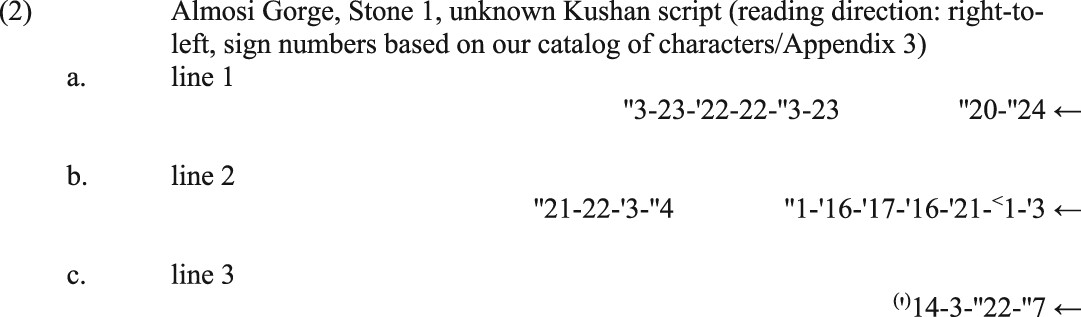
AG I gloss of unknown Kushan script characters

Then, hypothesizing that the text in the Kushan script contains the same elements as the Bactrian parallel and assuming that the language represented is an Indo-European language, Bonmann identifies the sequence 23-3 as the stem for "king" and the pattern (23-3-)22-22(-23-3) as "king of kings." Additionally, the sequence 16-17-16 is assumed to represent the Takhtu part of "Vema Takhtu,"` with 16-17-16 representing the sequence -TKT. Through further analysis, Bonmann rules out a Tocharian or Sogdian language as possible options for the language of the unknown script. The preliminary reading for the phrase "king of kings" then becomes ⟨Šā-W"-Nā-N'-Šā-W"⟩.

The decipherment has been described by researchers as a significant step toward understanding Kushan-era inscriptions and the region's administrative and cultural history.

== See also ==
- Decipherment of ancient Egyptian scripts
- Decipherment of cuneiform
