= The Starving of Saqqara =

Egyptian statue believed to be Predynastic in origin

- Material: Limestone
- Size: 67 cm (26 in), 80 kg (180 lb)
- Writing: Unknown script
- Created: Unknown period
- Discovered: Egypt, early 20th century
- Present location: Concordia University

The Starving of Saqqara is the name given to a statue of suspected Predynastic Egyptian origins. The statue of two seated nude beings (possibly a male and female) with large skulls and thin bodies has writing on the back of one of the figures that has yet to be identified. Traces of dark pigment suggest that it was once painted.

Vincent and Olga Diniacopoulos, who amassed a large collection of antiquities, brought the work to Canada in the 1950s. The sculpture was exhibited in the 1950s at their family-owned Galerie Ars Classica on Sherbrooke Street in Montreal. The name Saqqara refers to the burial ground of Memphis, Egypt. How the name came to be attached to the artifact is not known.

The statue has been at Concordia University since 1999. Experts from the University of Cambridge, the British Museum, the Brooklyn Museum, the Israel Museum and the Royal Ontario Museum have all been consulted, without success.

The script has been determined to not be Aramaic, Demotic, Egyptian, Hebrew, or Syriac.

One expert, Clarence Epstein, suggests that it represents a pair of conquered captives. Epstein theorized that the physiognomy of the statues suggest a possible Nubian origin or a depiction of Nubians. Egyptologist Robert Morkot noted that the statue was "certainly atypical" of Egyptian art. Morkot did not believe that it was pre-dynastic, but admitted it was difficult to know without context.

The sculpture was displayed to the public from March 16 to 18, 2011. It was viewable at the atrium of Concordia's Engineering, Computer Science and Visual Arts Integrated Complex.
