= Neolithic symbols in China =

Markings found at Neolithic sites in China

Beginning in the latter half of the 20th century, artifacts bearing markings dating to the Neolithic period have been unearthed at several archeological sites in China, mostly in the Yellow River valley. These symbols, collectively called Táo Wén (陶文 'pottery scripts'), have been compared to the oracle bone script — the earliest known forms of Chinese characters, first attested in the late 13th century BCE — and have been cited by some as evidence that Chinese writing has existed in some form for over six millennia. However, the Neolithic symbols have only been found in small numbers, and do not appear to go beyond pictorial techniques, as is required to obtain a true writing system representing spoken language.

== Nature ==
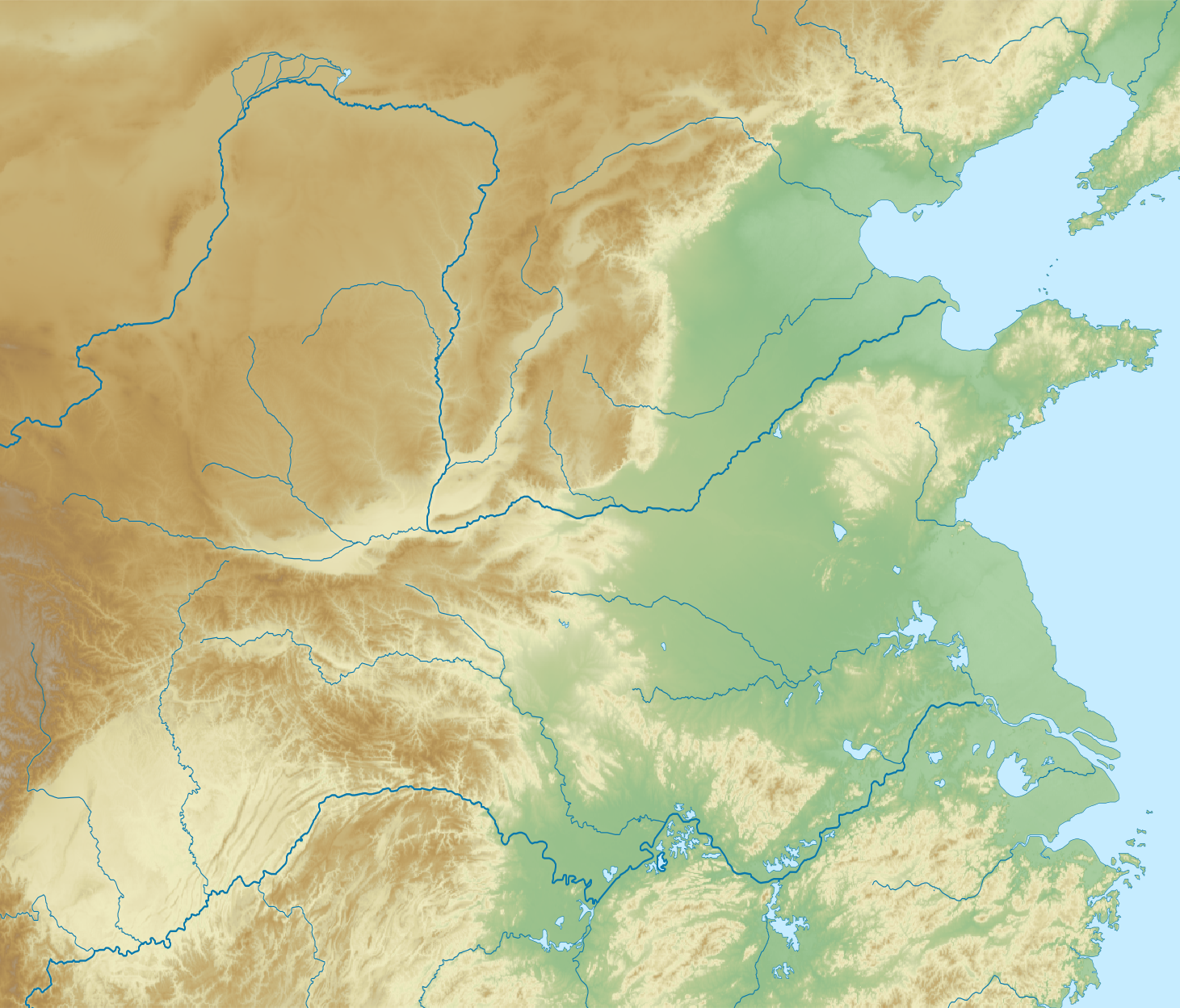
Neolithic sites yielding inscribed symbols. Digits indicate the millennium BC.

Small collections of symbols have been found at several archeological sites dating to the Neolithic period in what is now China. The symbols are either pictorial in nature, or are simple geometric figures, (Note: Qiu divides the Neolithic graphs into two basic categories: type A consist of geometric symbols such as +, | and x), and type B consists of those resembling concrete objects, i.e., pictorial symbols.) and have either been incised into or drawn onto artifacts—mostly pottery, but sometimes also turtle shells, animal bones or other items made of bone or jade. Sites include those identified with the Yangshao, Liangzhu, Majiayao and Longshan cultures.

There is no scholarly consensus whether any of these markings constitute a primitive writing system or proto-writing, or are merely a set of symbols (Note: In fact, similar symbols which were not clearly part of any writing system and continued to be used even in the early historical periods, from the Shang through the late Zhou and Han dynasties. It has been pointed out that illiterate people are often able to use limited sets of symbols, including numerals, to convey meaning in a manner which is not writing per se.) used for other purposes, such as identification. Some believe that Neolithic symbols are part of an incipient semiotic system that eventually led to the development of the mature Chinese writing system.

Others have characterized the markings as directly ancestral to modern Chinese writing, citing resemblances between individual symbols and individual characters of the later oracle bone script as evidence. Sinologist William G. Boltz points out that such comparisons are "notoriously risky and inconclusive" when based on such primitive scratch marks rather than on similarity in function. Boltz adds:

"There does not seem to be any meaningful order of repetition or concatenation that would lead us to suspect anything more than that these are random and largely unorganized, unsystematic markings."

In general, the Neolithic symbols which have been unearthed to date are found in isolated use (as would be expected with ownership marks or clan symbols) rather than in sequences consistent with representation of the spoken language, and there is no evidence of processes fundamental to the beginnings of a true, useful writing system such as phonetic loan usage. Qiu Xigui explains:

Only when symbols ... are consciously used to record words used to form sentences is there a true sign that the development of script has begun.

Evidence is still scant, even when considering evidence dating to the early Shang period:

While these materials are very valuable, they are unfortunately few in number and most of them are rather fragmentary so that they are far from being able to provide an ample basis for solving the problem of the formation of Chinese writing.

The earliest undisputed examples of true writing in China—where symbols are used to fully record language, rather than simply having individual meanings in isolation—are the oracle bones of the late Shang dynasty, with the earliest examples dated c. thirteenth century BCE. (Note: The traditional dating of the Shang extends earlier, to the 17th or 16th century BCE, but the oracle bone inscriptions date from the reigns of the last nine Shang kings, from Wu Ding.)

== Early Neolithic ==
The earliest Neolithic discovered in China symbols come from Jiahu, Dadiwan and Damaidi.

=== Jiahu ===
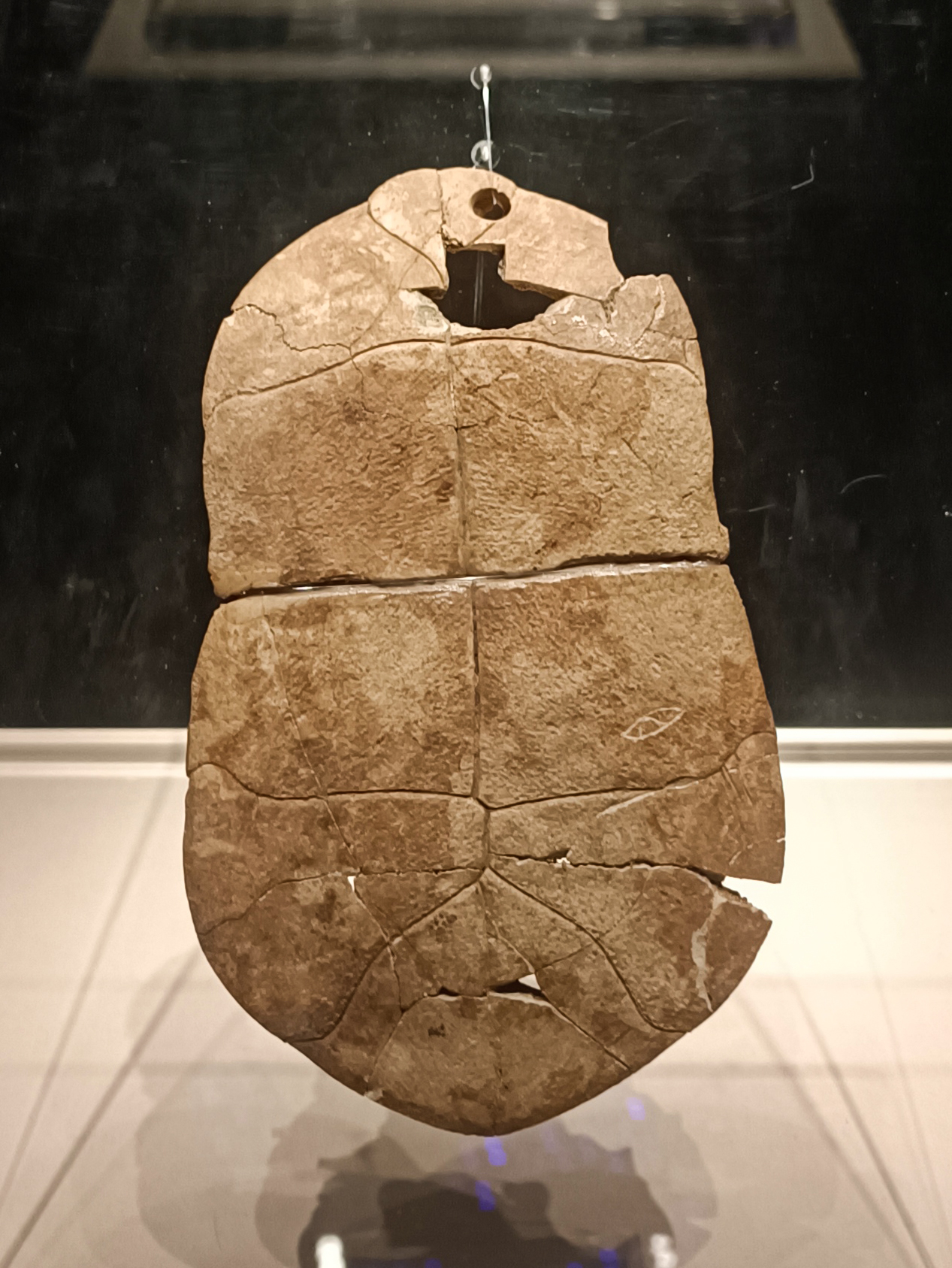
Turtle plastron from Jiahu inscribed with an eye-like symbol

Jiahu is a Neolithic site in the Yellow River basin within Wuyang County, Henan, dated to 6600–6200 BCE. This site has yielded turtle plastrons that were pitted and inscribed with markings. Scholars note that the use of such individual symbols should not be equated with writing, although it may represent an earlier, formative stage. In the words of the archaeologists who made the latest Jiahu discovery:

"We interpret these signs not as writing itself, but as features of a lengthy period of sign-use which led eventually to a fully-fledged system of writing...The present state of the archaeological record in China, which has never had the intensive archaeological examination of, for example, Egypt or Greece, does not permit us to say exactly in which period of the Neolithic the Chinese invented their writing. What did persist through these long periods was the idea of sign use. Although it is impossible at this point to trace any direct connection from the Jiahu signs to the Yinxu (Note: Yinxu means the Ruins of Yīn, referring to the last Shang dynasty capital at Xiǎotún, Anyang, Henan, where huge numbers of oracle bones were found, inscribed with what is still widely considered the earliest known Chinese writing.) characters, we do propose that slow, culture-linked evolutionary processes, adopting the idea of sign use, took place in diverse settings around the Yellow River. We should not assume that there was a single path or pace for the development of a script."

— Li Xueqin et al., 2003

Furthermore, the five-millennium gap between Jiahu and the Shang is a great distance and makes connections unlikely, as Chinese historian and paleographer Li Xueqin stated, and before the discovery of much related evidence, it's hard to consider the two to be connected. Oracle bone scholar David Keightley told the BBC the similar idea:

"There is a gap of about 5,000 years. It seems astonishing that they would be connected, [...] We can't call it writing until we have more evidence."

=== Dadiwan ===
Dadiwan (5800–5400 BCE) is a Neolithic site discovered in Qin'an County, Gansu. Its earliest phase has yielded symbols painted on the inside surfaces of pottery basins. More recent excavations there have also uncovered a handful of Neolithic symbols.

=== Damaidi ===
In Damaidi, at Beishan Mountain in Ningxia, 3,172 cliff carvings dating to 6000–5000 BCE have been discovered over an area of 15 square kilometers, including a reported 8,453 different kinds of pictures like celestial bodies, gods and hunting or grazing scenes. Researchers have identified 2,000 pictorial symbols, which they said are similar to later forms of ancient characters and many can be identified as such.

== Middle Neolithic ==
=== Banpo and Jiangzhai ===
Banpo pottery symbols

Jiangzhai pottery symbols

Another group of early symbols, which many have compared to Chinese characters, are the Banpo symbols from sites like Banpo, just east of Xi'an in Shaanxi dating from the 5th millennium BCE, (Note: Banpo is radiocarbon dated to 4770 to 4290 BCE after bristlecone pine correction (Woon reports 4000 BCE), while Jiangzhai, Xi'an is radiocarbon dated to 4020 to 3635 BCE (Woon reports 3500 BCE): Woon 1987, pp. 275 & 276 respectively.) and nearby, at Jiangzhai, in Lintong District, from the early 4th millennium BCE. As the Banpo symbols were discovered fairly early (1954–1957) and are relatively numerous (with 22 different symbols on 113 sherds), these have been the focus of the most attention.

Some scholars have concluded that they are meaningful symbols like clan emblems or signatures which have some of the quality of writing, perhaps being primitive characters, while others have concluded based on comparisons to oracle bone script that some of them are numerals. Still others feel they may be ownership or potters' marks.

Finally, some scholars sound a note of caution, calling such conclusions unwarranted or premature. This is because all of the Banpo-type symbols occur singly, on pottery and pottery fragments, unlike written words, which tend to occur in strings representing language. Thus, there is no context from which to conclude that the symbols are actually being used to represent language.

Furthermore, there is no evidence of the phonetic loan usage and semantic-phonetic compounding (Note: The Banpo symbols are monosomatic entities such as x, | and +, each with only one component. See Wénwù Press 1963 p.197, plate 141 and plates 167–171.) necessary to produce a functional script as seen in the Shang dynasty's oracle bone script.

Thus, leading scholar Qiu Xigui (2000) argues that:

What these symbols represent definitely cannot be a fully formed system of writing; this much is quite clear. Is there any possibility that they are primitive writing? Most likely there is not. We simply possess no basis for saying that they were already being used to record language. Nor viewed from the standpoint of the symbols of this same type that continued to be used following the creation of Chinese script do they even resemble script. [...] Quite a number of people, basing themselves on the Banpo-type symbols, have said that the history of Chinese writing goes back more than 6,000 years. Such claims are probably unjustified.

In Qiu's opinion, they instead more closely resemble the non-writing symbols which remained in use even into the early historical period. Another problem which has been noted is that, since the oracle bone script was fairly pictorial in nature, if one were to go back to ancestors predating them by over three millennia, one should expect an increase in the pictorial nature of the symbols, but in fact, a comparison of the majority of the Banpo symbols shows the exact opposite to be true.

However, it is possible that some of the Banpo or other Neolithic symbols were used as numerals in a pre-literate setting. It is also plausible that when writing eventually did emerge, some such Neolithic symbols already in use (and not necessarily from such an early site as Banpo) were absorbed into that writing system.

=== Other discoveries ===
Symbols unearthed in 1992 at Shuangdun in Bengbu in Anhui are said to include composite signs.

== Late Neolithic ==
=== Dawenkou ===
Since excavations began in the 1950s, artifacts bearing inscriptions dating to c. 2800–2500 BCE have been unearthed belonging to the Dawenkou culture in Shandong. These have attracted significant interest amongst researchers, in part because the Dawenkou culture is believed by some to be partially ancestral to the Longshan culture, which in turn is thought ancestral to the Shang. At a Dawenkou site in Shandong, one pictorial symbol has been found painted in cinnabar, while at the Dawenkou sites by the Lingyang River (陵陽河) and in Dazhu Village (大朱村), eighteen isolated pictograms of eight types incised or painted on sixteen pieces of pottery have been found, mostly from wealthier tombs. Some resemble axes, and another has been variously described as resembling the sun above a cloud or fire, while a third type has the latter above a fire or mountain-like element.

In addition to the similarity in style between these and pictographic Shang and early Zhou clan symbols, what is important about the latter two types is that they have multiple components, reminiscent of the compounding of elements in the Chinese script, thus eliciting claims of a relationship. Yu Xingwu identified the circle-and-cloud graph as the Chinese character for 'dawn', 旦, while Tang Lan identified it as 'bright' 炅.

As with each of the other Neolithic sites, the comparison is based on only a handful of isolated pictures, and there is again no evidence of use in strings of symbols such as we would expect with true writing – none of these appear jointly. (Note: Each jar or potsherd bears only one symbol, except for two vessels which each have two symbols but in separate locations on the vessels; Qiu 2000, p.34; Boltz 2003 notes that "They do not occur in any form that would suggest a text, or appear to have any linguistic context" (p.51).) Wang Ningsheng thus concluded that they are marks of personal or clan identity rather than writing. According to Wang, "True writing begins when it represents sounds and consists of symbols that are able to record language. The few isolated figures found on pottery still cannot substantiate this point." Keightley opines that "they probably served as emblems of ownership or identity on these pots and jades, rather than as words in a writing system". Boltz agrees that they may have been "the pre-Shang counterpart to the Shang clan-name insignia", but contrasts this with an actual writing system, for which there is not any evidence at that time, while Qiu concludes:

Even though the Dawenkou culture type B symbols still cannot be definitively treated as primitive writing, nevertheless they are symbols which resemble most the ancient pictographic script discovered thus far in China…They undoubtedly can be viewed as the forerunners of primitive writing.

=== Longshan culture ===
Eleven characters found at Dinggong in Shandong, China on a pottery shard, Longshan culture

The Chengziya site in Longshan, Shandong has produced fragments of inscribed bones presumably used to divine the future, dating to 2500–1900 BCE, and symbols on pottery vessels from Dinggong are thought by some scholars to be an early form of writing. Again, this is controversial. Symbols of a similar nature have also been found on pottery sherds from the Liangzhu culture of the lower Yangtze valley.

A pottery inscription of the Longshan culture discovered in Dinggong Village, Zouping County, Shandong contains eleven symbols that do not look like the direct ancestor of Chinese characters. Chinese scholar Feng Shi (馮時) argued in 1994 that this inscription can be interpreted as written by the Longshan people. Other scholars, like Ming Ru, are doubtful about attributing a Neolithic date to the inscription. The authenticity of these inscriptions is hotly disputed due to their appearance on a broken ceramic ware, an unusual feature among prehistorical text, as well as its unexpected similar appearance with the Yi script, a modern writing system associated with an ethnic group in the southwestern China, thousands of miles and thousands of years apart from the Longshan culture in northern China.

=== Possible Liangzhu symbols ===
There are also some items, including some inscribed jades, which have symbols similar to or identical to several of the Dawenkou pictures, such as the circle and peaked crescent motif, and another described as a bird perched on a mountain-like shape; it appears that some of these may belong to the Liangzhu culture.

Between 2003 and 2006, over 240 pieces bearing symbols belonging to the Liangzhu culture were unearthed at the Zhuangqiaofen ruin in Lindai, Zhejiang. The letters were determined to be 1000 years before the Anyang Chinese script. However, the discovery did not claim a connection with the Anyang script. The symbols at Liangzhu were determined by academics as not being written language.

=== Other discoveries ===
A few geometric symbols have been found carved in bone at Hualouzi, a second-phase Keshengzhuang culture site near Xi'an, which some have claimed to be ancestral to oracle bones, but this is disputed. In western Guangxi, late neolithic and bronze age artifacts have been uncovered bearing symbols (Zhuang: Sawveh 'etched script'). Some scholars have suggested that they may be a form of proto-writing, but this is also disputed, as the symbols occur singly, with no evidence of phrases.
