= Wargaade Wall =

Ancient stone enclosure in Somalia

Wargaade Wall, or Warqaadi, is an ancient stone construction in Wargaadhi, Hirshabelle, in Somalia. It enclosed a large settlement in the region.

== Overview ==
Graves and unglazed sherds of pottery dating from antiquity have been found during excavations in the area. The wall's building material consists of rubble set in mud mortar. The high wall measures 230 m × 210 m (750 ft × 690 ft). After the settlement was abandoned during the Islamic era, the population of Wargaade began using the wall as a source for building material, which contributed to its current eroded state.
