= Grakliani Hill =

Archaeological site in Georgia

Coordinates: 41.9964°N 44.4061°E

Grakliani Hill (Georgian: გრაკლიანი გორა, Grakliani Gora) is an archaeological excavation site in eastern Georgia near Kaspi, showing evidence of human presence possibly going back 300,000 years.

The site was discovered in 2007, during work to widen the Tbilisi-Senaki-Leselidze highway. Research is being done by students and faculty from Tbilisi State University. In 2015, a supposed script was discovered on the altar of a fertility goddess's temple, predating those previously known in the area by at least a thousand years.

== Layout ==
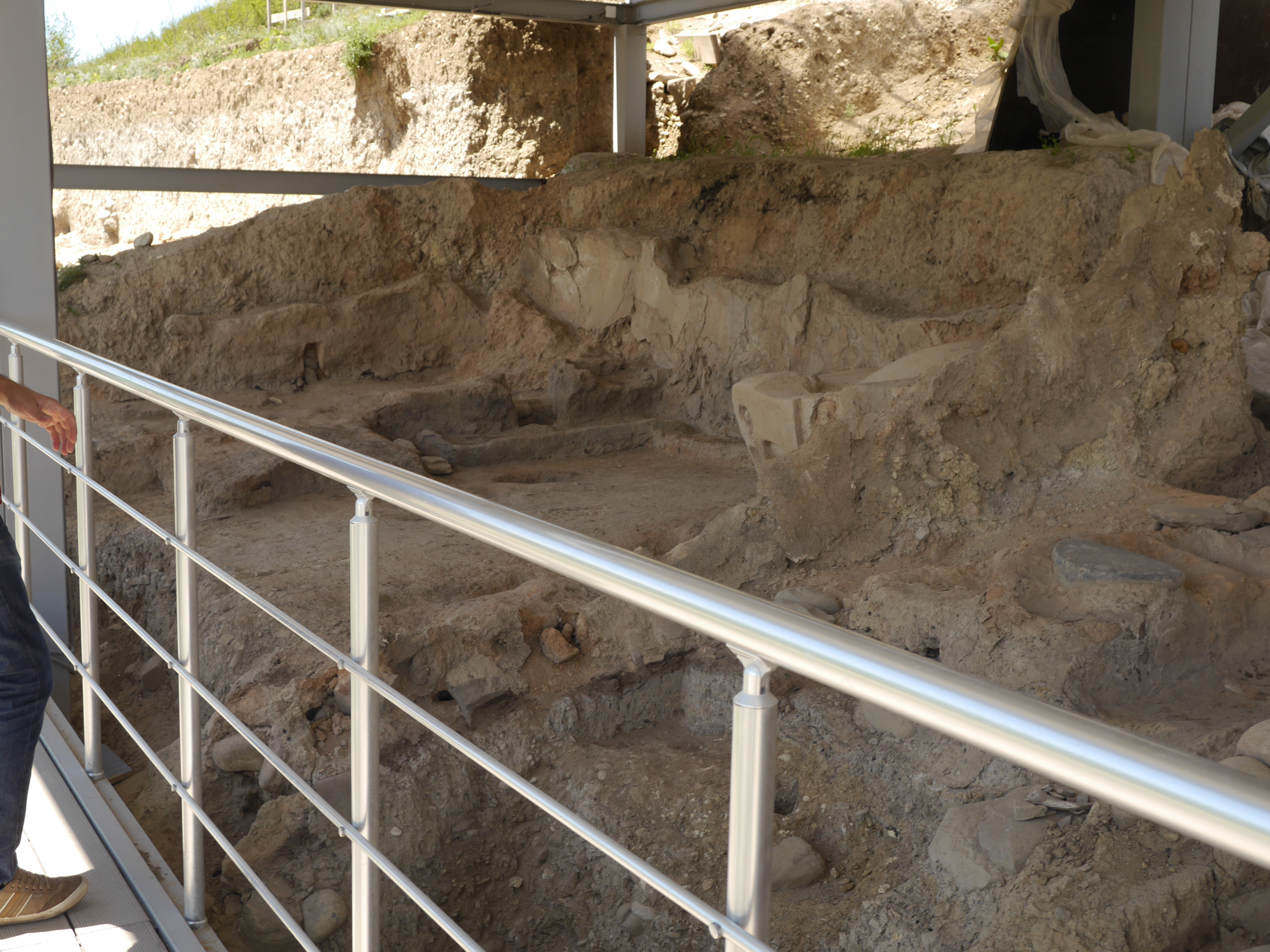
Grakliani Hill.

The site contains a temple to a fertility goddess from the seventh century BCE, a pit-type burial cemetery from the early Bronze Age, and the remains of a building from around 450-350 BCE; the building consists of three rooms with three storage rooms.

The site had been occupied between the Chalcolithic and the Late Hellenistic periods.

== Discoveries ==
The excavation of layers yielded artifacts including children's toys, weapons, icons, and pharmacological devices. Within the first two months of digging, archaeologists had excavated over 35,000 pieces from hundreds of graves and ruins of settlements that date back to the eighth century BCE.

Several golden and bronze discs from the sixth century were discovered. These findings attest that this society possessed the technology of gilding and engraving.

Among the most significant artifacts may be a fourth century BCE printing device. These were extremely rare seals used to stamp judicial documents; supposedly they originated from Uruk in Mesopotamia. Another notable find is that of a large and decorated ritual oven, an unprecedented find in archaeology.

=== Script ===
The discovery is very likely to change Georgian history and will seriously attract international interest.

— Mikheil Giorgadze, Culture Minister of Georgia

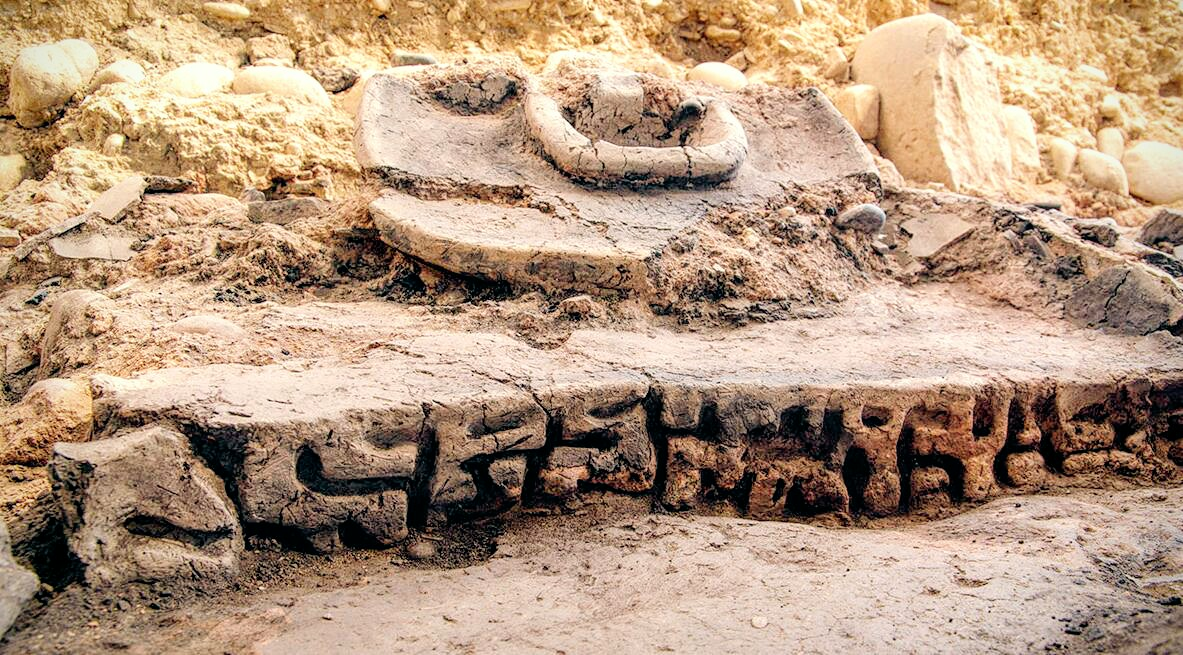
Grakliani script on the basement of altar of goddess of fertility (XI-X c. B.C.)

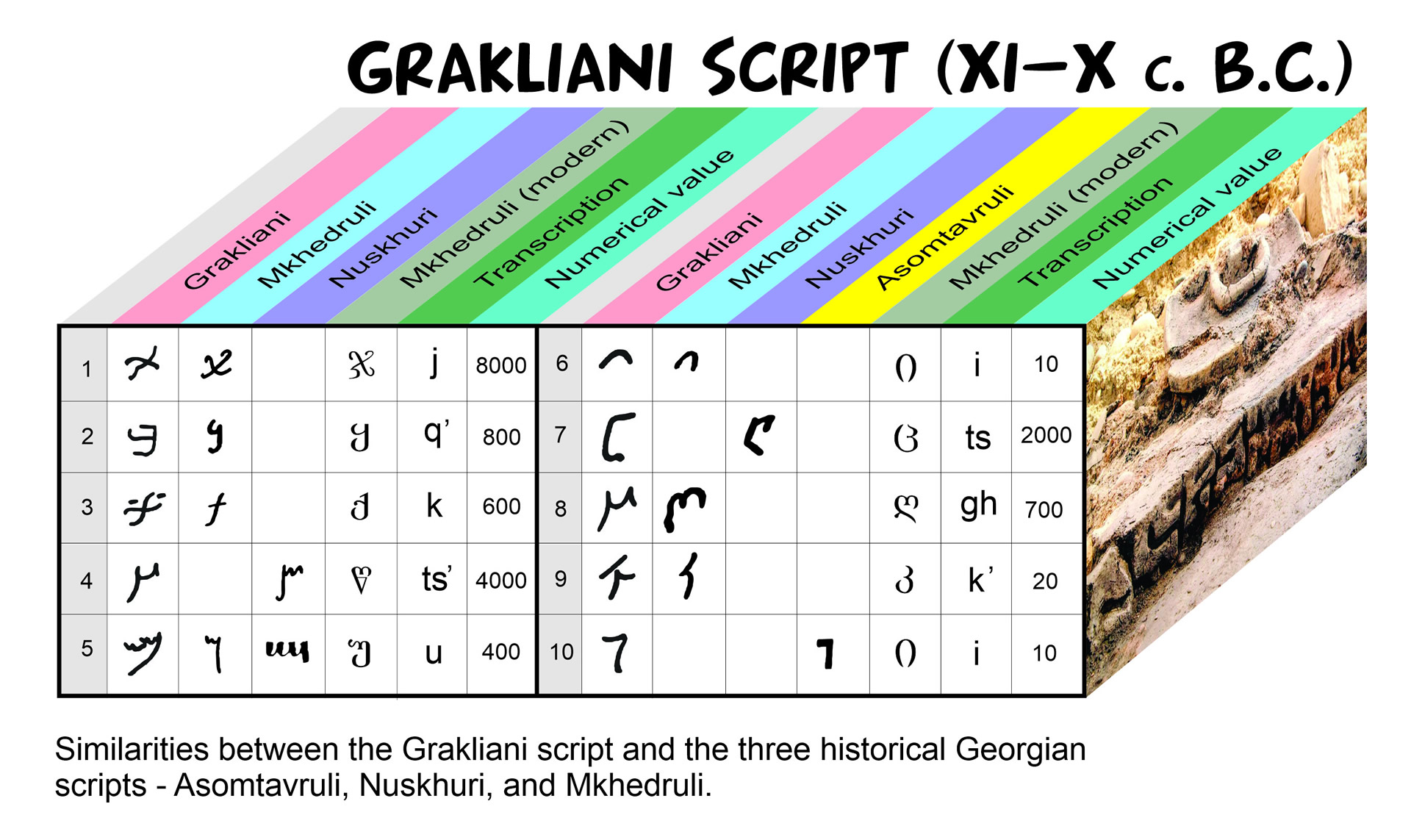
Similarities between the Grakliani script and the three historical Georgian scripts—Asomtavruli, Nuskhuri, and Mkhedruli.

A previously unknown script was discovered just below a temple's collapsed altar to a fertility goddess from the seventh century BCE. These inscriptions differ from those at other temples at Grakliani, which show animals, people, or decorative elements. The script as a whole bears no resemblance to any alphabet currently known, although Vakhtang Licheli argues that some letters share visual similarities to ancient Greek and Aramaic. The script appears to be the oldest native alphabet to be discovered in the whole Caucasus region, a thousand years older than any indigenous writing previously discovered in the region. In comparison, the earliest Armenian and Georgian scripts date from the fifth century CE, just after the respective cultures converted to Christianity. By September 2015, an area of 31 by 3 inches of the inscription had been excavated.

According to Vakhtang Licheli, head of the Institute of Archaeology of the State University, "The writings on the two altars of the temple are really well preserved. On the one altar several letters are carved in clay while the second altar’s pedestal is wholly covered with writings." The finding was made by unpaid students. After the revelation stipends became available and the government doubled the site's research budget.

Georgian linguist Kukuri Pipia proposed a deciphering scheme for the Grakliani script, arguing that it resembled the three Georgian scripts: Asomtavruli, Nuskhuri, and Mkhedruli.

== Significance to Georgia ==
According to Licheli, who headed the archaeological expedition, the collective findings affirm the 3000-year-old existence of a Georgian statehood. The Ministry of Culture plans to turn the site into an open-air museum by the end of 2015.

== See also ==
- History of writing
