= Damaidi =

Site of ancient early Chinese petroglyphs

Damaidi (simplified Chinese: 大麦地; traditional Chinese: 大麥地; pinyin: Dàmàidì; literally: Big wheat field) is the location of 3,172 sets of early Chinese petroglyphs, carved into the cliffs which feature 8,453 individual figures. Cliff carving expert Li Xiangshi stated that "The pictographs are similar to the ancient hieroglyphs of Chinese characters and many can be identified as ancient characters," Another expert said "Through arduous research, we have found that some pictographs are commonly seen in up to hundreds of pictures in the carvings." said Liu Jingyun, an expert on ancient Oracle Bone characters. The size, shape and meanings of the pictographs in different carvings are the same. These pictographs may be the origin of Chinese characters.

Damaidi itself is a small village located in Zhongwei in Central China, set amid the Weining Mountains on the north bend of the Yellow River.

== Cliff carvings ==
The dates of these carvings is uncertain. The latest were made during the Western Xia dynasty (1032-1227). Dates for the first carvings are disputed, with Zhou Xinghua from the Ningxia Museum suggesting a Paleolithic date and Professor of Archaeology at the Central University of Nationalities in Beijing suggesting 3,000 years, adding that modern technology was needed to be used to prove any dates. They feature environmental as well as social themes. There are carvings of the sun and moon along with other celestial bodies as well as of people hunting, herding and fighting. Archaeologists believe that some of these symbols (over 1,500) bear a resemblance to ancient hieroglyphs of Chinese characters. If dating estimates of the carvings are correct, this would push back the origins of Chinese writing (previously dated only as far back as the Jiaguwen Oracle Bone inscriptions found at Anyang) from 1250 BC to 6600 BC-6200 BC.
