= Tang Junqiao =

- Born: Anshan, Liaoning Province, China

Tang Junqiao (Chinese: 唐俊乔; pinyin: táng jùn qiáo) is a Chinese educator, musician and practitioner of the Dizi. She has performed traditional Chinese music with orchestras worldwide including the New York Philharmonic, London Symphony Orchestra and Bamberg Symphony. In the year 2000 she performed on the soundtrack of the Chinese martial arts film Crouching Tiger, Hidden Dragon which went on to win multiple awards for its musical score.

== Biography ==
Tang was born in Anshan into a family of musicians, with both her father (Tang De Zong) and uncle being flute players in Chinese opera troupes. After learning to play different types of Chinese musical instruments which included the Dizi and the Suona, she enrolled at the Shenyang Conservatory of Music college to further her education. In 1992 she moved to Shanghai to join the Shanghai Conservatory of Music where she studied under flautists Zhao Songting and inventor of the Koudi Yu Xunfa.

After playing for a few years in Shanghai, Tang was approached by composer Tan Dun whom had been looking for musicians that could perform traditional Chinese music on his score for the film Crouching Tiger, Hidden Dragon. Along with the Shanghai Symphony Orchestra, Tang used her ability to play traditional Chinese instruments to help produce the movie's soundtrack which later became one of its most notable features. The success of Crouching Tiger, Hidden Dragon allowed Tang to perform concerts worldwide including for as many as 30 world leaders during state visits to China.

In 2003 Tang left the Shanghai Symphony Orchestra to visit composer Guo Wenjing in Beijing and to study his renownedly difficult piece Chou Kong Shan. Two years later she returned to Shanghai to join the orchestra and with them performed in the United States at the Kennedy Center to critical applause.

In 2016, Tang started a project with support from the China National Art Fund to reproduce the sounds of the ancient bone flutes found at the Jiahu village archaeological site in Henan, China. The ancient flutes are the oldest known musical instruments from China, the oldest instruments ever found that are still functional, and among the first known multi-note instruments in the world. Tang and her team created over 30 flutes attempting to reproduce a similar sound, ultimately settling on a replica made of synthetic resin material and bitter bamboo as the best match. In 2018, Tang played music specifically composed for the replica instrument in the musical multimedia play, "Flute: Sound of Nature", at its debut at the Shanghai International Spring Music Festival.
