= Brew Masters =

- Genre: Documentary; Reality
- Presented by: Sam Calagione
- Composer: Sarah Schachner
- Country of origin: United States
- Original language: English
- No. of seasons: 1
- No. of episodes: 6

Production
- Camera setup: Multi-camera
- Running time: 42 min.
- Production company: Zero Point Zero Production

Original release
- Network: Discovery Channel
- Release: November 21 – December 16, 2010

Brew Masters is a television series that was run weekly on Discovery Channel starting on Sunday, November 21, 2010. The show focused on Sam Calagione, the founder and head of Dogfish Head Brewery in Milton, Delaware, and his staff as they searched the world for new, ancient, and imaginative inspirations for beers.

== History ==
The show originated with a visit to Dogfish Head Brewery's website, when someone at Discovery Channel saw the videos available there. Calagione said, "They could see we take beer very seriously but we don’t take ourselves too seriously." Discovery Channel decided the show's premise would be to focus on the process of beer creation and production at a specific brewery (in this case, Calagione's own Dogfish Head Brewery).

In March 2011, Anthony Bourdain, who shares a production company with Brew Masters, reported via Twitter that Brew Masters would be cancelled due to pressure by a large beer company who threatened to pull advertising. Author Andy Crouch later confirmed the cancellation, saying it was due to low ratings, rather than pressure from advertisers.

== Episodes ==
Each episode revolves around the creation and production of a specific beer. This is done by outlining the inspiration for creating the brew, then taking the viewer through the process of developing the recipe, testing it, and preparing it for production. Interspersed throughout are anecdotes about beer making, both in general and specific to Dogfish Head Brewery.

A total of six episodes were ordered for the first season. The first two episodes aired on Sunday nights at 10:00 PM EST/PST. After premiering Episode 3 on a Monday night (November 29) at 10:00 PM EST/PST, episodes 4 and 5 aired on Thursday nights at 8:00 PM EST/PST. The sixth episode was delayed due to its subject matter: the episode was originally to have featured the opening of Dogfish Head's new brewpub at Eataly in New York City. Delays in the brewpub's opening resulted in the episode remaining incomplete. While the brewpub has since opened, the accompanying episode has never aired in the U.S., though it aired in several other countries, including on DMAX in Germany, where it was titled "3 Biere für Batali".

The Season 1 DVD of the series was released in June 2011, and includes the previously unaired "3 Beers For Batali" episode. Amazon Video offers the first season for download, but this version does not include the unaired sixth episode.

No.	Title	Original release date
1	"Bitches Brew"	November 21, 2010
In the series premiere, Sam heads to Sony Records in New York City to create a special beer commemorating the 40th anniversary release of Miles Davis's Bitches Brew album.
2	"Chicha"	November 28, 2010
Sam heads to Peru to learn about chicha, an ancient corn-based beer. Using the recipes and brewing techniques he learns on this trip, the entire Dogfish Head staff is called on to create an authentic recipe for the Dogfish Head Brewpub, including chewing the corn themselves to assist with the fermentation.
3	"Punkin & Portamarillo"	November 29, 2010
Sam travels to New Zealand and collaborates with Epic Brewing Company to brew a special indigenous tamarillo and pōhutukawa brew for Beervana, an annual craft beer competition. Meanwhile, a crisis arises at Dogfish Head Brewery when several cases of Punkin Ale are found to be bottled in the wrong type of bottles.
4	"Grain To Glass"	December 9, 2010
Dogfish Head Brewery is enlisted to create a beer made from cedar scraps provided by the hand-made surfboard builders Grain Surfboards. When a panel of brewery taste testers rejects the latest batch of 120-Minute IPA, the brew masters rush to figure out if the beer can be salvaged.
5	"Ancient Ale"	December 16, 2010
Dogfish Head is about to brew a batch of "Chateau Jiahu" a 9000-year-old recipe based on pottery jars recovered from a village in Central China. Sam heads to Egypt in order to bring back to life beer from one of man's earliest civilizations.
6	"3 Beers For Batali"	N/A
Italian craft breweries are examined. Dogfish Head Brewery opens its newest restaurant: La Birreria, a rooftop brewpub in New York City's Eataly, and creates a series of specialty beers for the pub.
