= Dogfish Head Brewery =

American brewing company

Dogfish Head Craft Brewery
- Type: Subsidiary
- Industry: Alcoholic beverage
- Founded: June 1995; 31 years ago
- Founder: Sam and Mariah Calagione
- Headquarters: Milton, Delaware, U.S.
- Products: Beer, spirits
- Production output: 175,000 US beer barrels (205,000 hl)
- Owner: Boston Beer Company
- Website: dogfish.com

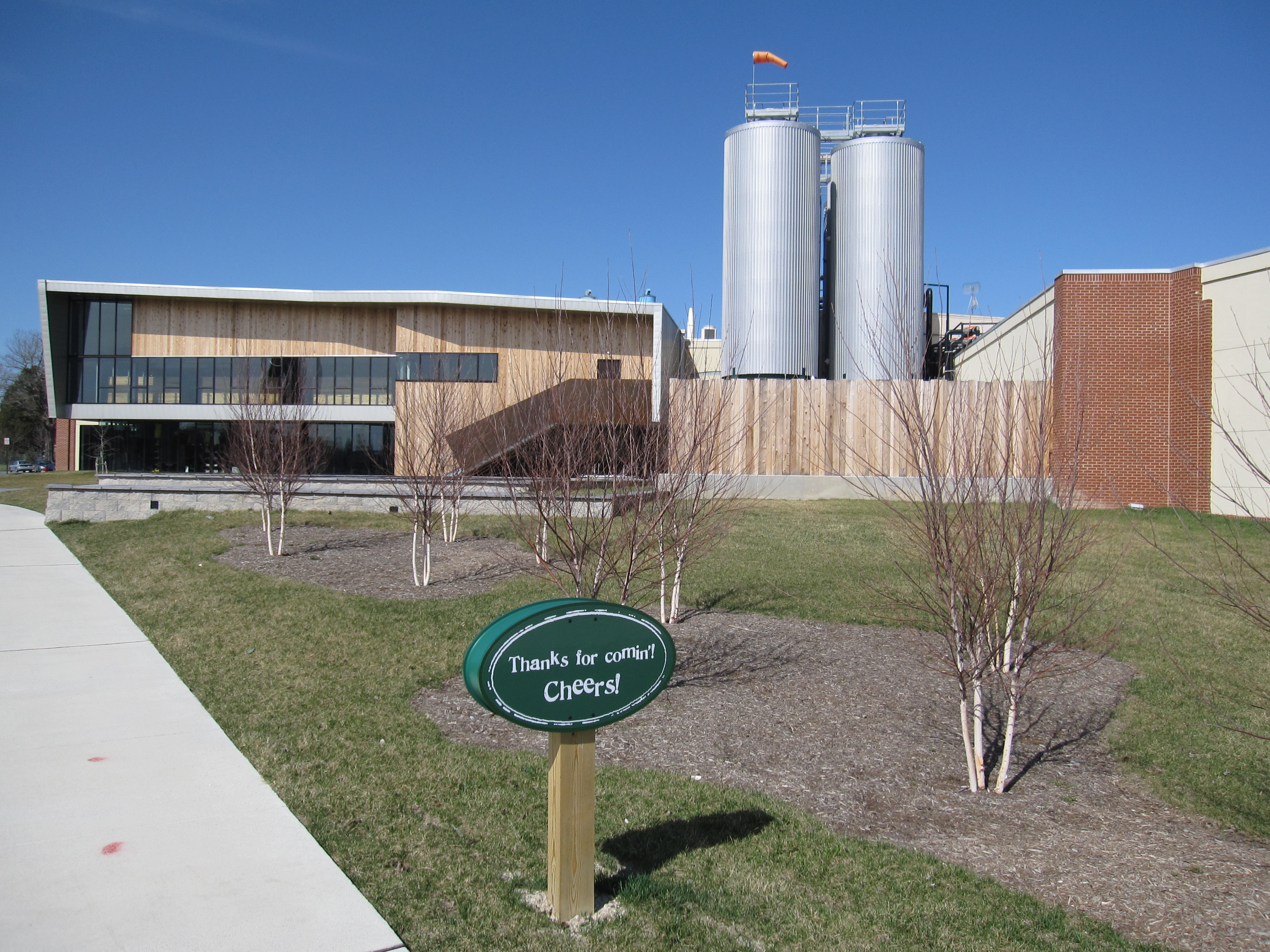
Brewery in Milton, Delaware

Dogfish Head Brewery is a brewing company based in Milton, Delaware, United States, founded by Sam and Mariah Calagione and, as of 2019, owned by the Boston Beer Company. It opened in 1995 and produces 262,000 barrels of beer annually.

Select brews (including many of the brewery's seasonal and one-off selections) can be found in 31 U.S. states, plus Washington, D.C. Dogfish Head also licenses "Dogfish Head Alehouse" located in Gaithersburg, Maryland. Beer-paired food and vintage bottles of Dogfish Head's seasonal beers are available at their alehouses, as well as kegged offerings of their staple beers. The company also has a restaurant called Dogfish Head Brewings & Eats along with a seafood restaurant called Chesapeake & Maine that only sources seafood from the eponymous locations. Both are located in Rehoboth Beach, Delaware. In July 2014 the Dogfish Head Inn was established in Lewes, Delaware running along the Rehoboth-Lewes Canal.

The brewery was featured prominently in the documentary Beer Wars and was the subject of the Discovery Channel series Brew Masters, which premiered Sunday, November 21, 2010. The brewery takes its name from Dogfish Head, Maine, where Calagione spent summers as a child.

== History ==
Sam Calagione started brewing in his kitchen in New York City, where he created his first beer out of overripe cherries with his roommates Ken Marino and Joe Lo Truglio. Dogfish Head has brew houses in Rehoboth, Lewes, and Milton, Delaware. The first successful beer that Dogfish Head produced was Midas Touch, which was brewed with honey, white Muscat grapes, and saffron. Although it started by only selling beer in the state of Delaware, Dogfish Head became one of the most profitable microbreweries in the United States. As of 2017 it distributed its beer in 38 states, the most recent being Louisiana.

In 1995, Calagione opened Dogfish Head Brewings & Eats in Rehoboth Beach, Delaware. Initially, beer was brewed in three kegs heated by propane burners, five days a week. Calagione subsequently experimented with ingredients, producing beers such as Espresso Bock, Arctic Cloudberry Imperial Wheat, and Punkin Ale.

=== Acquisition by Boston Beer Co. ===
In 2019, Calagione had informal talks with Jim Koch, co-founder of the Samuel Adams brewing Boston Beer Company, at the annual Extreme Beer Fest in Boston. Within a few months, they were purchased by Boston Beer Co. Dogfish Head announced the acquisition by the Boston Beer Company for $300 million on May 9, 2019. As part of the merger, Calagione and his wife, Mariah, converted their Dogfish Head stock into Boston Beer Co. stock, thereby becoming the second largest non-institutional owners of the merged companies.

== Products ==
Dogfish Head tends to produce experimental or "extreme" beers, such as the tongue-in-cheek "Liquor de Malt", a bottle-conditioned malt liquor, which typically comes in a Dogfish Head brown paper bag. Dogfish Head products often use non-standard ingredients, such as green raisins in Raison D'Être ale. Some beers, including the WorldWide Stout, 120 Minute India Pale Ale, and the raspberry-flavored strong ale Fort, are highly alcoholic, reaching 18% to 20% alcohol by volume (typical beers have around 3% to 7% alcohol by volume).

One of Dogfish Head's more notable odd beers was a green beer called Verdi Verdi Good, produced in 2005 and sold only on draft. The beer was not colored green artificially; rather, the green color was derived from brewing a Dortmunder style beer that contained spirulina, or blue-green algae.

Pangaea, first released in 2003, is a Belgian-style strong pale ale made with ingredients from every continent on Earth, including: crystallized ginger from Australia, water from Antarctica, basmati rice from Asia, muscavado sugar from Africa, quinoa from South America, European yeast, and North American maize.

The New York Times in 2010 profiled the brewery's efforts to make chicha beer, a traditional Latin American beverage made from maize, which requires chewing the corn and spitting it in a communal pot.

In 2020 the brewery began producing hand sanitiser in response to the COVID-19 pandemic.

=== IPAs ===
Dogfish Head's best-selling product is its line of India Pale Ales (IPAs), which are offered in eight varieties:

- 60 Minute IPA (denoting the length of the boil with which hops are continually added)
- 90 Minute IPA
- 120 Minute IPA
- Sixty-One, a beer-wine hybrid brewed with Syrah grape must
- Aprihop, a Spring seasonal IPA brewed with apricots
- Burton Baton, an imperial oak-aged IPA
- Hazy-O, a hazy IPA brewed with oats and wheat
- 75 Minute IPA (cask or bottle conditioned)

The longer hops are boiled, the more hop isomerization takes place, and the more bitterness is imparted to the beer. The 60 Minute is described by the company as "a session IPA brewed with Warrior, Amarillo and Simcoe" and rated at 60 IBUs. Dogfish Head introduced a device in 2003 jokingly called Randall the Enamel Animal, an "organoleptic hop transducer module" which "Randallizes" a given beer by passing the beer through a large plastic tube filled with a flavor enhancer, often raw hops, though adaptations such as fruits and coffee beans amongst others have also been used. The alcohol in the beer lifts oils off the raw hops and imparts even more hop flavor and aroma to beers that were already hoppy to begin with.

The 75 Minute IPA was developed in 2008, and has been produced in very limited quantities, and typically distributed to vendors in firkins. The beer—nicknamed "Johnny Cask" and featuring a mascot resembling a young Johnny Cash tapping a firkin with a mallet—is made from a mixture of the 60 and 90 Minutes IPAs, and undergoes a separate cask conditioning which includes the addition of maple syrup. As a variation on the 75 Minute IPA, the Alehouse 75 is also available. It is a mixture of the 60 and 90 Minute offerings, yet is served in a standard Sankey-style keg, rather than a firkin.

=== Ancient Ales ===
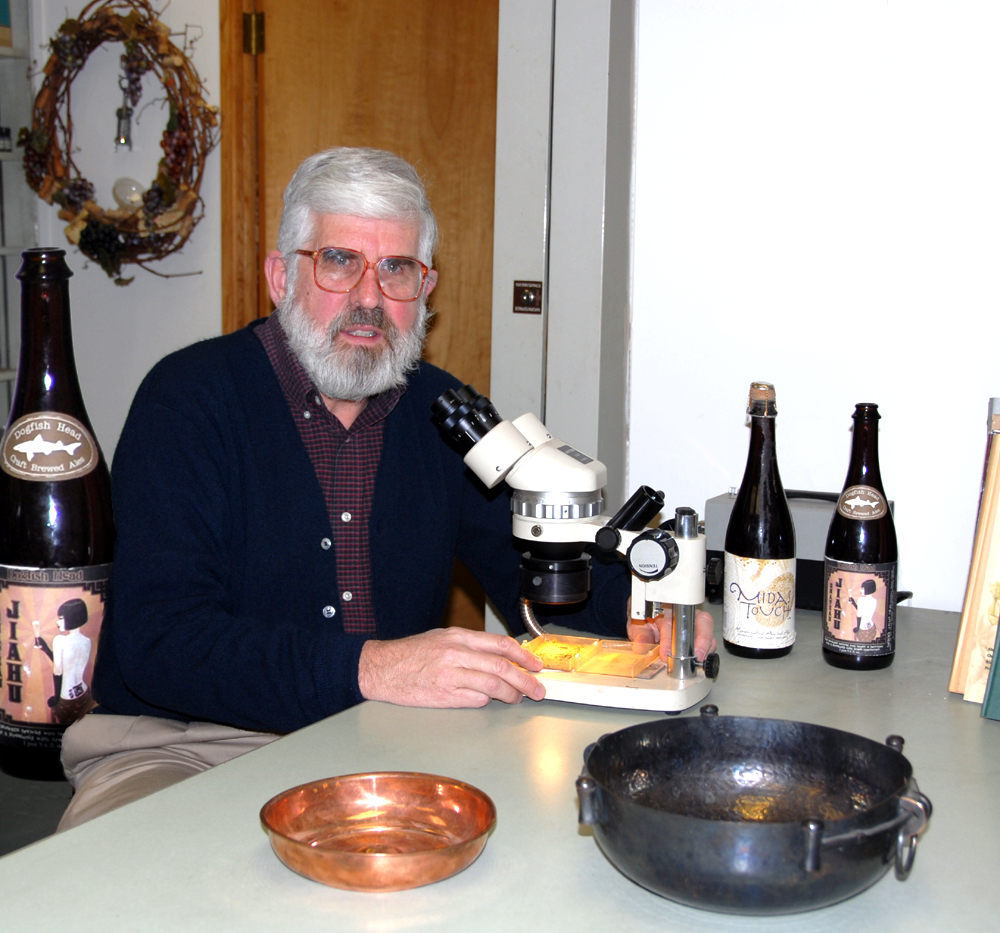
Dr. Pat McGovern analyzing a sample of the "King Midas" beverage residue

In the late 90s, Dogfish Head started an "Ancient Ales" series, in which beer recipes were created based upon the chemical analysis of residue found on pottery and drinking vessels from various archaeological sites. These beers have been produced in collaboration with molecular archaeologist Dr. Pat McGovern of the University of Pennsylvania. As of 2010, four such brews have been crafted, and only one (Midas Touch) is produced year-round. The others are produced on a limited basis.

- Midas Touch Golden Elixir (first released in 1999). A strong ale based on residue found on drinking vessels from the tomb of King Midas, dating back to the 8th century BC. Defining ingredients include Muscat grapes, honey, and saffron. (See section below for more information.)
- Chateau Jiahu (first released in 2006). A spiced strong ale based on residue from pottery found in the Neolithic village of Jiahu (in central China), dating to the 7th millennium BC. Some defining ingredients include rice flakes, wildflower honey, hawthorn fruit, and Chrysanthemum flowers. As of 2009, this is the oldest known beer recipe to be brewed in the modern age.
- Theobroma (first released in 2008). A chocolate beer based on residue found on pottery discovered in Honduras dating to approximately 1200 BC. Some defining ingredients include Aztec cocoa powder, honey, and annatto.
- Ta Henket (first released in 2010, bottles released in late 2011). This beer was created to incorporate ancient ingredients and techniques described in Egyptian hieroglyphics. It was brewed with emmer, loaves of hearth baked bread, dom-palm fruit, chamomile, and zatar. Fermentation was carried out by a native Egyptian saccharomyces wild yeast strain captured from the air in Egypt.

=== Midas Touch ===
Midas Touch Golden Elixir, marketed as Midas Touch, was first marketed in June 2001. The recipe for this beverage is based on the chemical analysis of residues found in clay vessels believed to date back to the 8th century BC. Originally discovered in Gordium, Turkey during a 1957 dig by archaeologist Rodney Young, the content of these vessels was left unknown for 40 years. In 1997, molecular archeologist Dr. Patrick McGovern received a phone call from a former student of his informing him of a residue on clay jars from the tomb of King Midas. Dr. McGovern quickly did chemical analysis finding all aspects of the drink except for the spicing agent but made an assumption of saffron due to regional availability.

In March 2000, Calagione attended a special dinner for beer writer Michael Jackson. At this time McGovern and Calagione met and discussed recreating the brew. In early 2001 the new beverage was served at a dinner recreating the funeral feast of King Midas. At $150 a plate the meal was a benefit to support the Chemical Archaeology program at University of Pennsylvania.

Dogfish Head brewery dispenses approximately 1,700–1,800 cases per month to distributors. At the time of discovery Midas Touch Golden Elixir was the oldest fermented beverage recipe discovered. Dogfish Head brewery still today holds the record with a 9,000 yr old recipe used for Chateau Jiahu, which was released in July 2007.

The ingredients for the original 7.5% ABV recipe in 2001 included yellow muscat grapes, lightly toasted 2-row barley malt, thyme, honey and saffron. The ingredients for the 9% ABV recipe include barley, white Muscat grapes, honey and saffron.

=== Noble Rot ===
In 2010, Calagione collaborated with Washington winemaker Jarrod Boyle of Alexandria Nicole Cellars to produce a "hybrid" beer-wine beverage labeled Noble rot. A saison-style beer, the brewery uses botrytis-infected Viognier and Pinot gris grapes from Alexandria Nicole's Destiny Ridge Vineyard in the Horse Heaven Hills AVA in the brew. This results in a beer with 49.5% of the fermentable sugars coming from grapes that finishes with a 9% alcohol level. Alexandria Nicole presses the grapes, leaving the skins with the must, and Dogfish co-ferments the Viognier and grains while adding the Pinot gris later in the process. In 2012, the beer went nationwide in the United States in more than 27 states from coast to coast and received positive reviews from several beer columnists.

=== Sah'tea ===
In 2009, the Dogfish Head team began experimenting to produce their own version of the traditional Finnish-style beer called sahti. Traditional sahti is brewed with a variety of grains, malted and unmalted, including barley, rye, wheat, and oats; then flavored with juniper berries in addition to, or instead of, hops. The old-school style of brewing sahti also includes the step of heating hot rocks over a fire and using them to boil the wort. They departed from the traditional recipe, however, with the creative inclusion of Maya Tea Company's Original Chai tea in their brew, resulting in a rich, malty, and lightly spiced brew.

== List of beers brewed ==
Name	Original Release Date	Availability	Description	ABV%	IBU
60 Minute IPA	Feb 2003	Year Round	A continuously hopped IPA brewed with a slew of Pacific Northwest hops. A powerful but balanced East Coast IPA with a lot of citrusy hop character	6.0	60
90 Minute IPA	Apr 2001	Year Round	A continuously hopped imperial IPA with a malt backbone that stands up to the extreme hopping rate.	9.0	90
120 Minute IPA	Apr 2003	Limited	One of the world's strongest IPA clocking in at approximately 18% ABV. In 2014, it was released in the months of February, June, and October	18.0	120
75 Minute IPA	Jan 2012	Limited	A blend of 60 minute IPA, 90 minute IPA, and maple syrup carbonated naturally and dry-hopped with whole-leaf Cascades. In 2014, it was available in February, June, August, and December	7.5	
American Beauty	Oct 2013	Limited	A strong pale ale inspired by the rock band the Grateful Dead and brewed with granola. The brewery drew on fan suggestions to help create the recipe.	9.0	55
Aprihop	Mar 2004	Seasonal (Spring)	American IPA brewed with apricots	7.0	50
Bitches Brew	Jun 2010	Limited	Inspired by the Miles Davis album of the same name, Bitches Brew is a fusion of three threads of an American Imperial Stout and one thread of Ethiopian Tej (a honey beer with gesho root)	9.0	38
Black & Blue	Feb 2007	Limited	Belgian style Fruit Beer fermented with blackberries and blueberries	10.0	25
Blue Hen Pilsner	Apr 2021	Limited	A pilsner brewed with water, hops, yeast and malted barley	4.8	N/A
Burton Baton	Nov 2004	Year Round	English Old Ale mixed with the 90 Minute IPA	10.0	70
Chateau Jiahu	Jul 2006	Limited	Herbed/Spiced Beer brewed with orange blossom honey, muscat grapes and hawthorn berry	10.0	10
Chicory Stout	Jul 1995	Limited	Stout brewed with roasted chicory, organic Mexican coffee, St. John's Wort, and licorice root	5.2	21
Festina Pêche	Jun 2007	Seasonal (Summer)	Berliner Weisse fermented with peaches	4.5	8
Fort	Oct 2005	Limited	Fruit Beer brewed with over a ton of pureed raspberries	18.0	49
Hardtack	Mar 2011	Limited	Barley wine brewed with Tibetan purple highland prairie barley, agave nectar, rhodiola rosea, dried sour cherries, and aged for two months in port wine barrels filled with forty pounds of sour morello cherries	10.0	40
Hazy-O	Oct 2020	Year Round	A Hazy IPA brewed with oats and wheat, dry hopped to deliver a taste of citrus, mango and pineapple	7.1	45
Hellhound On My Ale	May 2011	Limited	An IPA brewed with dried lemon peels and flesh. Brewed to commemorate the 100th birthday of Mississippi Delta bluesman Robert Johnson	10.0	100
Higher Math	Nov 2015	Limited	Golden strong ale fermented with sour cherry juice and cocoa nibs.	17.0	35
Immort Ale	Jul 1997	Limited	American Strong ale brewed with maple syrup, peat-smoked barley, juniper berries, and vanilla	11.0	50
Indian Brown Ale	Dec 1999	Year Round	An American Brown Ale that is a cross between an IPA and a Scotch ale	7.2	50
Lawnmower	Jul 2007	Limited	An American Blonde Ale available only on draught	4.0	9
Life & Limb	Oct 2009	Limited/Collaboration	American Strong ale brewed in collaboration with Sierra Nevada Brewing with pure maple syrup from the Calagione family farm in Massachusetts and estate barley grown at the Sierra Nevada brewery in Chico, California, then carbonated with birch syrup fresh from Alaska	10.0	
Liquid Truth Serum IPA	2016	Year Round	Unfiltered IPA brewed with four different styles of hops, with a citrus and tropical notes	7.0	65
Liquor De Malt	Feb 2009	Not Available	Malt Liquor	7.0	
Midas Touch	Mar 1999	Year Round	Herbed/Spiced Beer brewed with honey, white muscat grapes, and saffron	9.0	12
My Antonia	Oct 2008	Limited	My Antonia (named after the Willa Cather read), is a continually-hopped imperial pilsner. This lager for ale lovers is citrusy, sweet and refined.	7.5	
Namaste	Jun 2009	Year Round	Witbier brewed with dried organic orange slices, fresh cut lemongrass, and coriander	5.0	20
Noble Rot	Feb 2011	Limited	Saison fermented with Botrytis-infected Viognier and Pinot gris grapes and Botrytis wine must	8.3	35
Olde School Barleywine	Oct 2002	Limited	A bone crushing Barley wine fermented with figs and dates.	15.0	85
Palo Santo Marron	Dec 2007	Year Round	An unfiltered, unfettered, unprecedented Brown Ale aged in handmade Paraguayan palo santo wooden brewing vessels	12.0	50
Pangaea	Nov 2003	Limited	Herbed/Spiced Beer brewed with ingredients from every continent including Australian crystallized ginger, water from Antarctica, Asian basmati rice, African muscavado sugar, South American quinoa, European yeast, and North American maize	7.0	28
Piercing Pils	Dec 2013	Seasonal (Winter)	A lager/perry hybrid brewed with pear tea.	6.0	35
Poppa Skull	2010	Limited/Collaboration	Belgian Strong Dark Ale brewed in collaboration with Three Floyds Brewing spiced with cardamom. Aged on palo santo wood and in oak brandy barrels	10.0	20
Portamarillo	2010	Limited/Collaboration	Porter brewed in collaboration with Epic Brewing Company of New Zealand fermented with tamarillo which were smoked using wood chips from the pōhutukawa tree	7.0	50
Punkin Ale	Nov 1994	Seasonal (Fall)	A full-bodied Brown Ale with smooth hints of pumpkin and brown sugar. Punkin Ale is brewed with pumpkin meat, brown sugar and spices.	7.0	28
Raison d'Etre	Mar 1998	Year Round	A deep mahogany Belgian Strong Dark Ale brewed with beet sugar, raisins and Belgian-style yeast	8.0	25
Raison d'Extra	Feb 2007	Limited	Our Raison D'Etre, with a little extra. This immodest brew, made with an obscene amount of malt, brown sugar and raisins, takes Belgian-style browns to new heights.	16.5	40
Red & White	Jan 2007	Limited	Witbier fermented with Pinot noir juice	10.0	35
Repoterroir	2011	Limited/Collaboration	Lager brewed in collaboration with Sierra Nevada Brewing, Avery Brewing Company, Allagash Brewing Company, and Lost Abbey. A distinct lager with native terroir from Sierra Nevada (wild rice, beets, cucumber, mint, and carrots), Avery (alfalfa honey), Allagash (purple potatoes), Dogfish Head (Atlantic "beach" wood), and Lost Abbey (Pacific "beach" wood).	5.5	
Sah'tea	May 2009	Limited	Sahti brewed with rye, juniper berries, black tea, cardamom, cinnamon, ginger, cloves, black pepper, and wort caramelized over hot rocks	9.0	6
Saison du BUFF	2010	Limited/Collaboration	Saison/Farmhouse ale brewed in collaboration with Stone Brewing Co. and Victory Brewing Company once at each brewery with different ingredient ratios. Brewed with parsley, sage, rosemary and thyme.	6.8	
SeaQuench Ale	July 2016	Year Round	Sour ale brewed with black limes and sea salt	4.9	10
Shelter Pale Ale	Jun 1995	Year Round	A Pale Ale only available on draught	5.0	30
Sixty-One	Mar 2013	Year Round	Dogfish Head's best-selling 60 Minute IPA plus one new ingredient: syrah grape must from California.	6.5	60
Squall IPA	May 2009	Limited	Unfiltered, bottle-conditioned Imperial IPA	9.0	
Sun-Day-Feels	2020	May–August	Sour beer brewed with peaches, grapes, and citrus	6.5	15
Theobroma	May 2008	Limited	Chili Beer brewed with Aztec cocoa powder, cocoa nibs, honey, chilies, and annatto	9.0	8
Tweason'ale	July 2011	Year Round	Gluten-free beer brewed from sorghum, strawberries and buckwheat honey	6.0	
World Wide Stout	Dec 1999	Limited	Brewed with a ridiculous amount of barley, World Wide Stout, an Imperial Stout, is dark, roasty and complex. This Ageable Ale clocks in at 15–20% ABV and has a depth more in line with a fine port than with a can of cheap, mass-marketed beer.	18.0	70
Wrath of Pecant	Feb 2010	Limited/Collaboration	Brown Ale brewed in collaboration with Beer Advocate for Extreme Beer Fest 2010 with pecan-wood smoked malt, plantains, and carob	6.0	35

Source: Dogfish Head Brewery – The Brews

== Collaborations and events ==
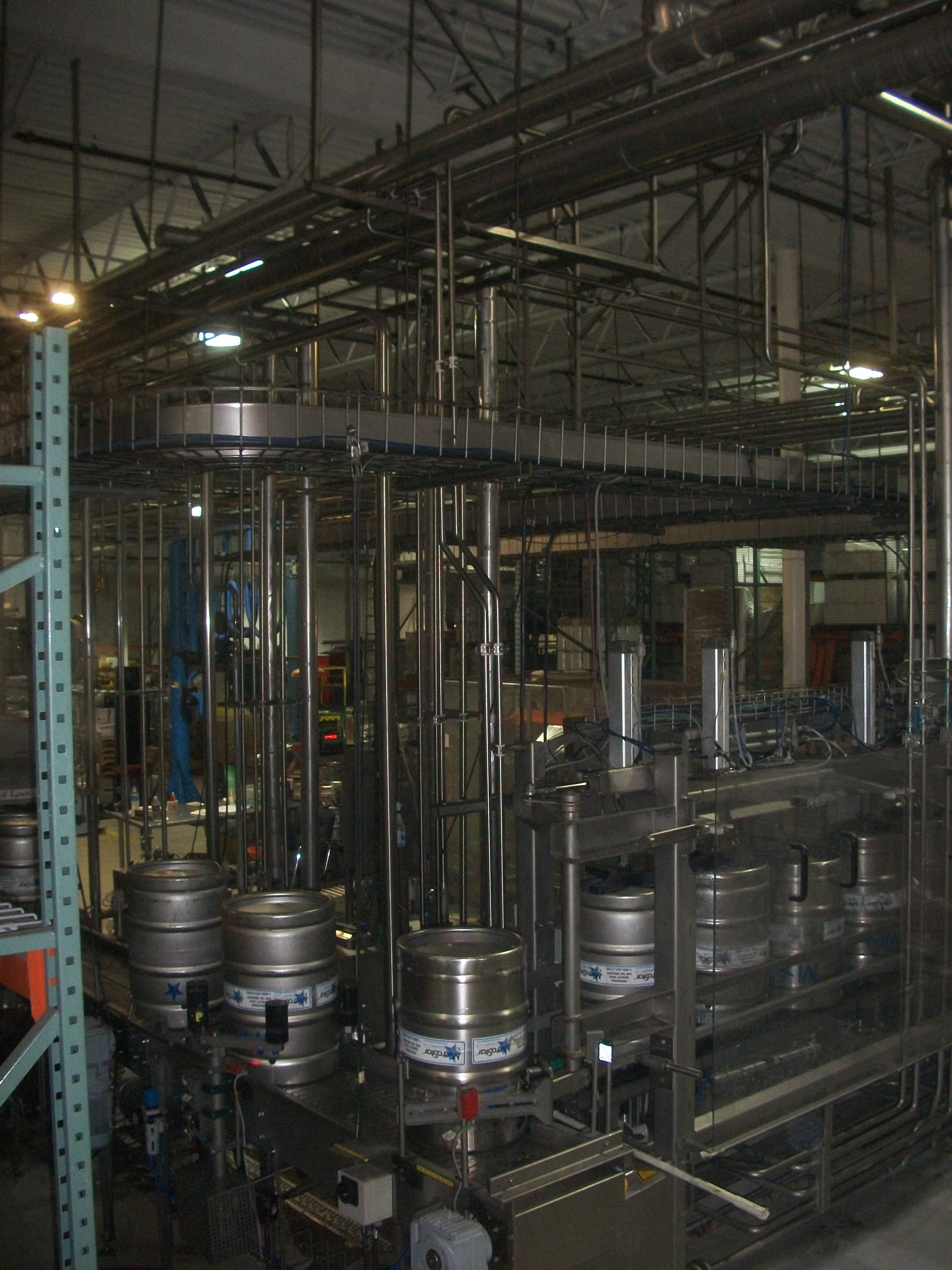
Keg production line at the Dogfish Head Brewery.

=== Microdistillery ===
Dogfish Head also operates a microdistillery at the Rehoboth Beach brewpub. Spirits are hand-distilled in a small pot still and often, like their beers, tend toward unique and non-traditional formulations. The distillery is very small; Dogfish Head spirits are distributed only in Delaware and a handful of other states.

=== Partnerships ===
Dogfish Head often collaborates with businesses outside of the beer industry. Dogfish Head has worked with the Grateful Dead to create a strong pale ale called American Beauty, a pickle company in Brooklyn, NY called Brooklyn Brine to create a pickle with beer ingredients, and Speigelau, a crystal glass company in Germany to design a unique IPA glass, and more. Calagione believes that collaboration with businesses like these distinguishes the Dogfish Head brand.

Dogfish Head will be one of the main partners in Birreria, the roof-top brewpub being constructed at Mario Batali's Eataly project in New York City. They had originally planned on collaborating with 3 other breweries – Russian River Brewing Company, as well as Birrificio Baladin and Birra del Borgo, both from Italy, but Russian River Brewing Company withdrew. They aim to craft rustic, artisanal beers that will pair directly with food served at the restaurant. The beers were brewed in a copper-clad brewing system and will be unpasteurized, unfiltered, naturally carbonated, and hand-pulled through traditional beer engines, recalling old world Italian craft brewing. The Eataly brewpub opened in 2011.

=== Media ===
Calagione and the brewery were the focus of Brew Masters, a Discovery Channel series that gave viewers an inside look at the brewery's operations, starting with the recipe development process and through the bottling and packaging process. The series premiered on Sunday, November 21, 2010 with an episode focusing on the creation of the Bitches Brew beer to commemorate the Miles Davis album of the same name. The final episode aired on December, 16th 2011 and chronicled the brewing of Chateau Jiahu, one of their Ancient Ales.

Dogfish Head's Brewings & Eats restaurant was featured in a December 2021 episode of the Cooking Channel's Man v. Food.

=== Sponsorships ===
Dogfish Head is the annual lead sponsor of Beer Advocate's Extreme Beer Fest in Boston, Massachusetts. Each year, Dogfish Head brews a special beer for the festival in collaboration with the Alström brothers of Beer Advocate. This special beer's name is voted on by visitors to the Beer Advocate website. The beer brewed for 2010's festival was "Wrath of Pecant". In addition to the year's special beer, Dogfish Head (like most other breweries) bring specially-altered version of normal beers such as 120 minute IPA pressurized through whole-leaf hops, Red & White pressurized through orange peels, and World Wide Stout pressurized through espresso beans in 2010.
