= Patrick Edward McGovern =

American ancient foods expert (1944–2025)

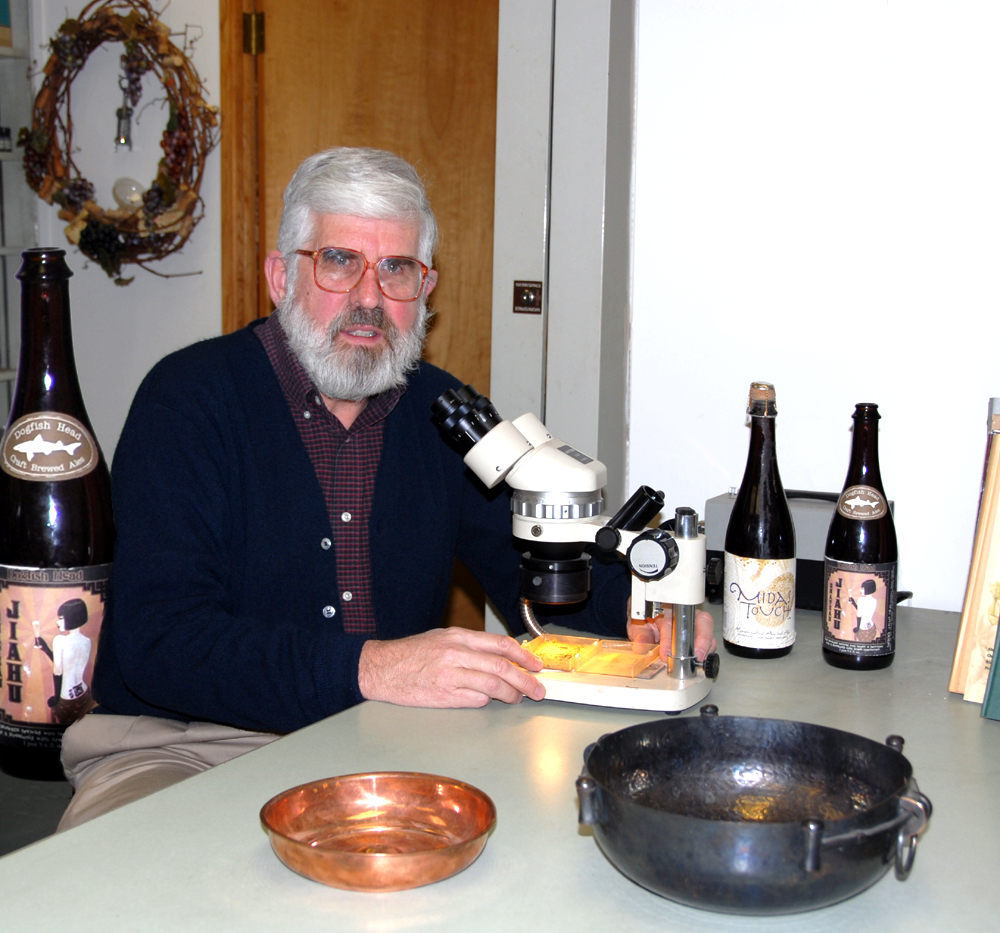
McGovern examining a sample of a beverage residue under a microscope

Patrick Edward McGovern (December 9, 1944 – August 23, 2025) was an American ancient foods expert who was the scientific director of the Biomolecular Archaeology Laboratory for Cuisine, Fermented Beverages, and Health at the University of Pennsylvania Museum in Philadelphia, where he was also an adjunct professor of anthropology. In the popular imagination, he was known as the "Indiana Jones of Ancient Ales, Wines, and Extreme Beverages".

== Background ==
Patrick Edward McGovern was born in Corpus Christi, Texas, on December 9, 1944. His academic background combined the physical sciences, archaeology, and history–an A.B. in chemistry from Cornell University, graduate work in neurochemistry at the University of Rochester, a Ph.D. in Near Eastern archaeology and literature from the Asian and Middle Eastern Studies Department of the University of Pennsylvania, and a Ph.D. in Neurochemistry and Chemistry from the University of Rochester Brain Research Center and the University of Pennsylvania.

== Career ==
Over the course of his more than three-decade career at the Penn Museum, his laboratory has been at the cutting edge of applying new scientific techniques to archaeology, often referred to as archaeometry or archaeological science.

A cesium magnetometer survey in 1978 in the Baq'ah Valley of Jordan, a Penn Museum project under the direction of McGovern, located one of the largest early Iron Age burial caves ever found in the southern Levant. Some of the 227 excavated individuals in the tomb were adorned with pairs of iron anklets and bracelets. The analyses showed that the metal was a mild steel, among the earliest instances of this iron-carbon alloy ever found.

The ancient pottery and glass vessel technology programs developed in the 1980s were highly innovative at the time and remain so.

=== Laboratory for Cuisine, Fermented Beverages, and Health ===
Early in the 1980s, the laboratory pioneered the interdisciplinary field of Biomolecular Archaeology. This field promises to open up whole new chapters relating to human genetic and cultural development, including cuisine, medical practice, architecture and other crafts over the past 4 million years and more.

==== Investigations of ancient dyes, foods, beverages, and other organics ====
First came the chemical attestation of the earliest Royal or Tyrian Purple, the famous dye of the seafaring Phoenicians, demonstrating that ancient organic compounds (specifically, 6,6'-dibromoindigotin) could survive over 3000 years. Amphora and vat sherds with purple residues on their interiors were recovered by a Penn Museum team at Sarepta (Sarafand) along the coast of Lebanon, the first homeland site in Phoenicia to be extensively excavated. Piles of molluscan shells of two of the three Mediterranean species (Murex trunculus and M. brandaris) yielding Purple, preferentially broken to extract the glands with the dye precursors, and kilns for heating the extracts, together with the chemical evidence, argued strongly that the sherds derived from an ancient Canaanite Purple dye factory.

In the early 1990s, the laboratory identified the earliest chemically confirmed instances of grape wine and barley beer from the Near East, viz., from Godin Tepe in Iran, ca. 3400-3000 B.C. Several years later, the earliest date for wine was pushed back another two millennia to the Neolithic period (ca. 5400-5000 B.C.), based on analyses of jars from the museum's excavation at Hajji Firuz in Iran. In a paper published 2017 in the Proceedings of the National Academy of Sciences, a team of historians and scientists explicated the biomolecular archaeological and archaeobotanical evidence for a further backdating to 6000–5800 B.C. DNA studies of grape has shown that the Eurasian grape (Vitis vinifera) was probably domesticated in the mountainous Near East, in the region extending from the northwestern Zagros Mountains to Transcaucasia to the eastern Taurus Mountains, as early as 7000 B.C. These investigations led to the Eurasian grape being chosen as the first fruit to have its genome fully sequenced.

Research at the start of the new millennium focused on the Neolithic period of ancient China's Yellow River valley. At the site of Jiahu, the laboratory discovered the earliest alcoholic beverage in the world dating back to about ca. 7000-6600 B.C. It was a mixed fermented beverage of rice, honey, and grape and/or hawthorn (Crataegus pinnatifida and C. cuneata) fruit.

The laboratory and collaborators began studying some of the most ancient chocolate from ancient Mesoamerica (ca. 1400-1100 B.C.) in 2004. Jars from Puerto Escondido in Honduras were in the shape of the cacao (Theobroma cacao) pod or fruit, as if to advertise the contents as being a chocolate beverage. The fruit's sweet pulp contains about 15% sugar, which naturally ferments to a 5 to 7% alcoholic beverage. This beverage might have led to the domestication of the tree. In later Mayan and Aztec times, the chocolate beverage was made from the beans (seeds) with additives including honey, chili peppers, fragrant flowers, etc. Like grape wine, rice wine, and barley beer in the Old World, chocolate "wine" went on to become the prerogative of royalty and the elite generally, and a focus of religion in the New World. No additives were detected in the early Puerto Escondido vessels, so it is likely that the chocolate beverage then was made only from the pulp.

==== Archaeological oncology ====
The laboratory has embarked on a recent initiative ("Archaeological Oncology: Digging for Drug Discovery") to discover herbal and tree resin compounds in ancient alcoholic beverages that have anti-cancer and other medicinal properties. Alcohol readily dissolves organic compounds in botanicals, and provides a ready means to administer them by drinking or applying to the skin. Ancient humans had a huge incentive in trying to find any cure they could, and over millennia might well have discovered empirical solutions, even if they couldn't explain them scientifically. Superstition might well creep in, but in certain periods, like the Neolithic, humans were remarkably innovative in the domestication and probably the discovery of medicinal plants. They have been lost to us when the cultures collapsed and disappeared, but can now be rediscovered using Biomolecular Archaeology.

Archaeological Oncology can help speed up the drug discovery process and recover some of these lost remedies. For example, a biomolecular archaeological study of a liquid contained inside a tightly lidded Shang dynasty bronze vessel, dated to ca. 1050 B.C., indicated that a Chinese wormwood/mugwort species (Artemisia annua and/or Artemisia argyi) had been dissolved into a rice wine. In vitro studies of the active medicinal compound in the plant—artemisinin or its synthetic derivative artesunate—have been shown to be remarkably effective against a whole range of cancers, including Lewis lung carcinoma, colon cancer (adenocarcinoma), Kaposi's sarcoma (connective tissue), uveal melanoma, hepatoma, ascitic liver tumor, ovarian cancer, pancreatic cancer, neuroblastoma, and myeloid leukemia.

Analyses of some of the earliest wine from the tomb of Scorpion I at Abydos, Egypt, dated to ca. 3150 B.C., has revealed the presence of a host of herbal additives, including herbs—savory (Satureja), Artemisia seibeni (a member of the wormwood family), blue tansy (Tanacetum annuum), balm (Melissa), senna (Cassia), coriander (Coriandrum), germander (Teucrium), mint (Mentha), sage (Salvia), and/or thyme (Thymus/Thymbra). Some active compounds in these plants have also shown to have in vitro anti-cancer effects The jar residues also yielded the earliest fragments of ribosomal DNA (as long as 840 base pairs) from a precursor of the wine/beer/bread yeast, Saccharomyces cerevisiae.

==== Modern re-creations of ancient beverages ====
In the late 1990s, the laboratory and collaborators analyzed the extraordinarily well-preserved organic residues inside the largest known Iron Age drinking-set, excavated inside the burial chamber of the Midas Tumulus at Gordion in Turkey, ca. 740-700 B.C. The reconstruction of the "funerary feast"–which paired a mixed or extreme fermented beverage of grapes, barley and honey, viz. wine, beer and mead ("Midas Touch," see below) with a spicy, barbecued lamb and lentil stew–is the first time that an ancient meal has been re-created based solely on the chemical evidence.

The gala re-creation of the feast was at the Penn Museum in 2000; other dinners have been held in California, Michigan, and Washington, D.C. A re-creation at the tomb itself was filmed for a Channel 4 special in Britain–the beverage, made by the Kavaklidere winery, was served in and drunk from re-created vessels, and local villagers from Polatli prepared the stew by grinding the lentils in basalt mortars and barbecued the meat on open-fire spits.

McGovern took his scientific study of ancient alcoholic beverages one step further by re-creating them, both to learn more about how ancient humans accomplished what they did and to bring the past alive. His collaboration with Dogfish Head Brewery led to the commercial version of Midas Touch, the brewery's most awarded brew in major tasting competitions, Chateau Jiahu (based on the earliest alcoholic beverage from China), and Theobroma (an interpretation of the ancient cacao beverage and named after the tree). Maize or corn chicha was a non-commercial experiment, following traditions of the ancient Inca Empire, in which native Peruvian red maize was chewed to break the carbohydrates down into sugars; pepperberries and strawberries were also added. A re-creation of an ancient Egyptian brew (Ta-Henket = ancient Egyptian "bread-beer"), which is based on archaeobotanical and Biomolecular Archaeological evidence dating between ca. 16,000 and 3150 B.C., was released in early December 2011.

== Publications ==
McGovern is well known for his book on Ancient Wine: The Search for the Origins of Viniculture (Princeton University, 2003/2006), which received the Grand-Prix in Histoire, Littérature et Beaux-arts from the International Organisation of Vine and Wine plus two other awards.

One of his later books, Uncorking the Past: The Quest for Wine, Beer, and Other Alcoholic Beverages (Berkeley: University of California), received an award from the Archaeological Institute of America.

In addition to over 150 periodical articles, he has written or edited another eight books, including The Origins and Ancient History of Wine (Gordon and Breach, 1996), Organic Contents of Ancient Vessels (MASCA, 1990), Cross-Craft and Cross-Cultural Interactions in Ceramics (American Ceramic Society, 1989), and Late Bronze Palestinian Pendants: Innovation in a Cosmopolitan Age (Sheffield, 1985). In 2000, his book entitled The Foreign Relations of the "Hyksos": A Neutron Activation Study of Middle Bronze Age Pottery from the Eastern Mediterranean (Oxford: Archaeopress) was published.

Fifteen international stories have also publicized his laboratory's discoveries to a wider public around the world in print media, on TV and radio, and over the internet. The laboratory's research has been profiled in seven video programs, including a full-length feature filmed at the Midas Tumulus in Turkey (above). Its findings have been the focus of museum exhibits in Philadelphia, Athens, the Napa Valley, France, and elsewhere.

As a consulting scholar in the Near East Section of the Penn Museum, he also directed the Baq'ah Valley (Jordan) Project over the past 25 years, and has been involved with many other excavations throughout the Middle East as a pottery and stratigraphic consultant. A detailed study of the New Kingdom Egyptian garrison at Beth Shan, an older Penn Museum excavation, also appeared in 1994 in the Museum Monograph series, entitled The Late Bronze Egyptian Garrison at Beth Shan.

As an adjunct professor in the anthropology department at Penn, he taught courses on molecular archaeology and archaeological ceramics.

== Personal life and death ==
In 1972, McGovern married Doris Nerdmeier. He died from prostate cancer at his home in Media, Pennsylvania, on August 23, 2025, at the age of 80.

== See also ==
- Ancient Iranian peoples
- Senna (plant)
