= Gudi (instrument) =

Oldest musical instrument discovered in China

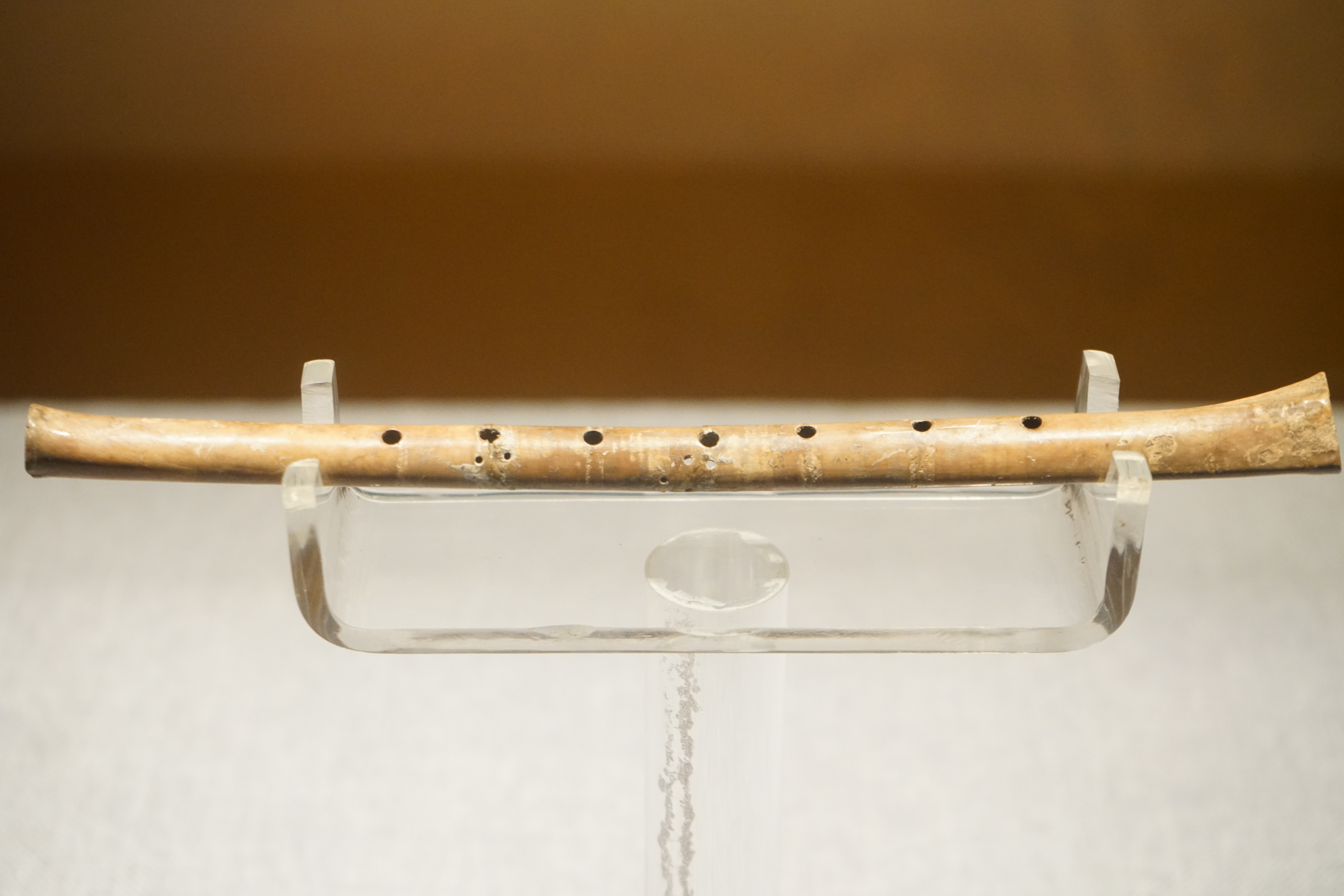
One of the gudi flutes discovered at Jiahu, on display at the Henan Museum

The Jiahu gudi (simplified Chinese: 贾湖骨笛; traditional Chinese: 賈湖骨笛; pinyin: Jiǎhú gǔdí; lit. 'bone flute') are the oldest known musical instruments from China, dating back to around 6000 BCE.

== History ==
Since 1984, six complete bone flutes, as well as the fragments of at least thirty more, have been excavated from several early Neolithic Jiahu culture tombs in Jiahu, Wuyang County, Henan Province, in Central China. They have been dated to 6000 BCE.

== Description ==
The bone flutes have average dimensions of approximately 20 cm × 1.1 cm (7.9 in × 0.4 in), and are made from the legs of the red-crowned crane. They are open-ended and vary in the number of their finger holes, from one to eight; the 4 holed version has 3 holes in front and one thumb hole in back. The Jiahu bone whistles are much shorter than the flutes, with lengths of 5.7 to 10.5 cm (2 to 4 in), and generally having a smaller amount of holes. The number of holes and the spacing between the holes determined the musical range and scale or mode in which the flute was intended to function. Lee and Shen believed that the Jiahu culture understood the "resonance of an air column" (see open tube and closed tube) and were able to create an instrument that contained their "complete interval preference of Chinese music". Blowing across the open end of an end-blown bone flute to produce a musical sound, is accomplished in the same way, and produces a similar effect, as blowing across the open top of a bottle. The eight-holed flute can play "all harmonic intervals and two registers." These harmonic intervals are said to be a "function of culture" and were of a larger set compared to that now familiar in the West. Bone flutes were apparently also played as part of sacrificial rites, and employed in bird hunting. Gudi are not very common now, but there are some musicians today who play them. Musician Tang Junqiao organized a team in 2016 to replicate the bone flute, and played music composed for the instrument at the Shanghai International Spring Music Festival.

== Gallery ==
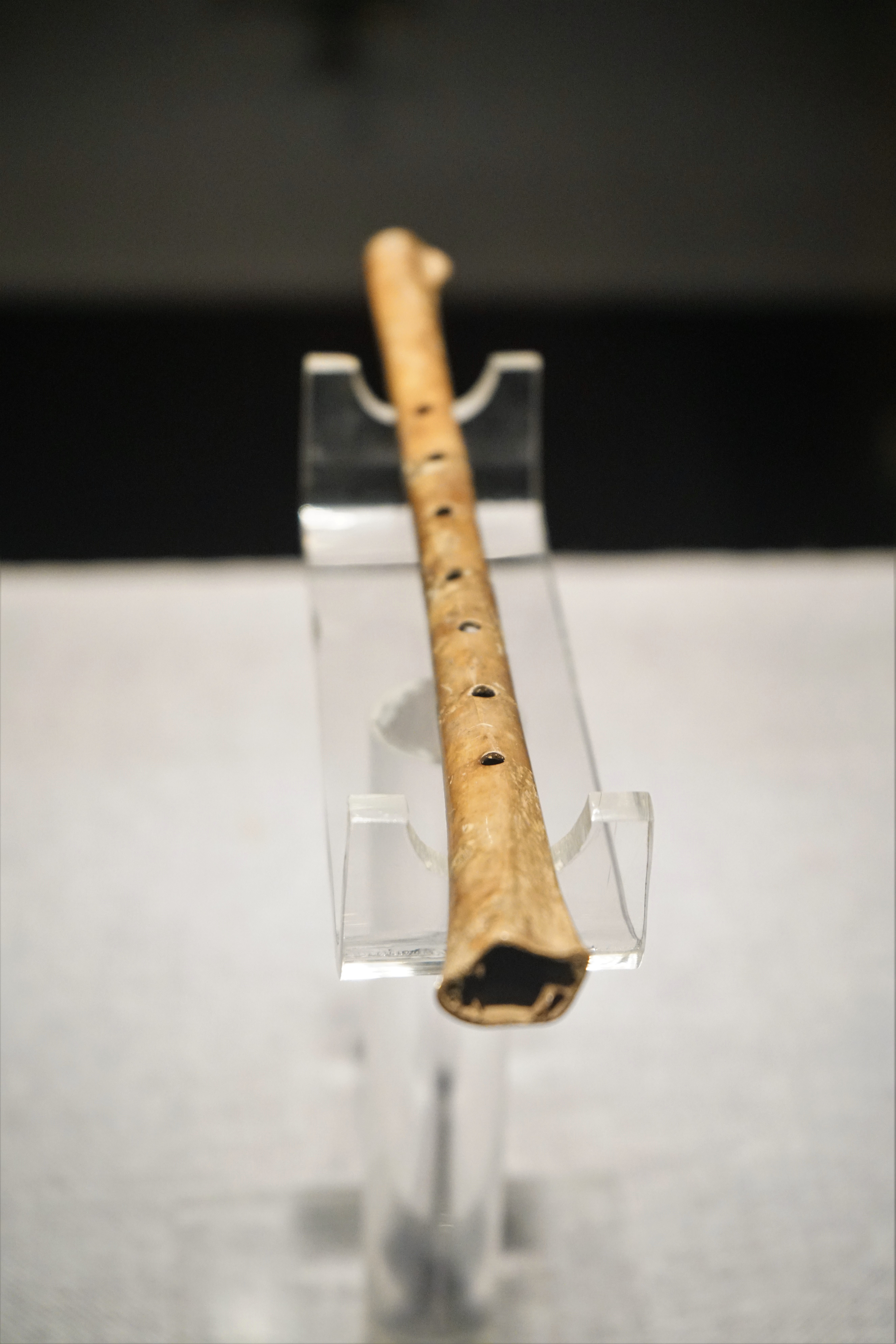

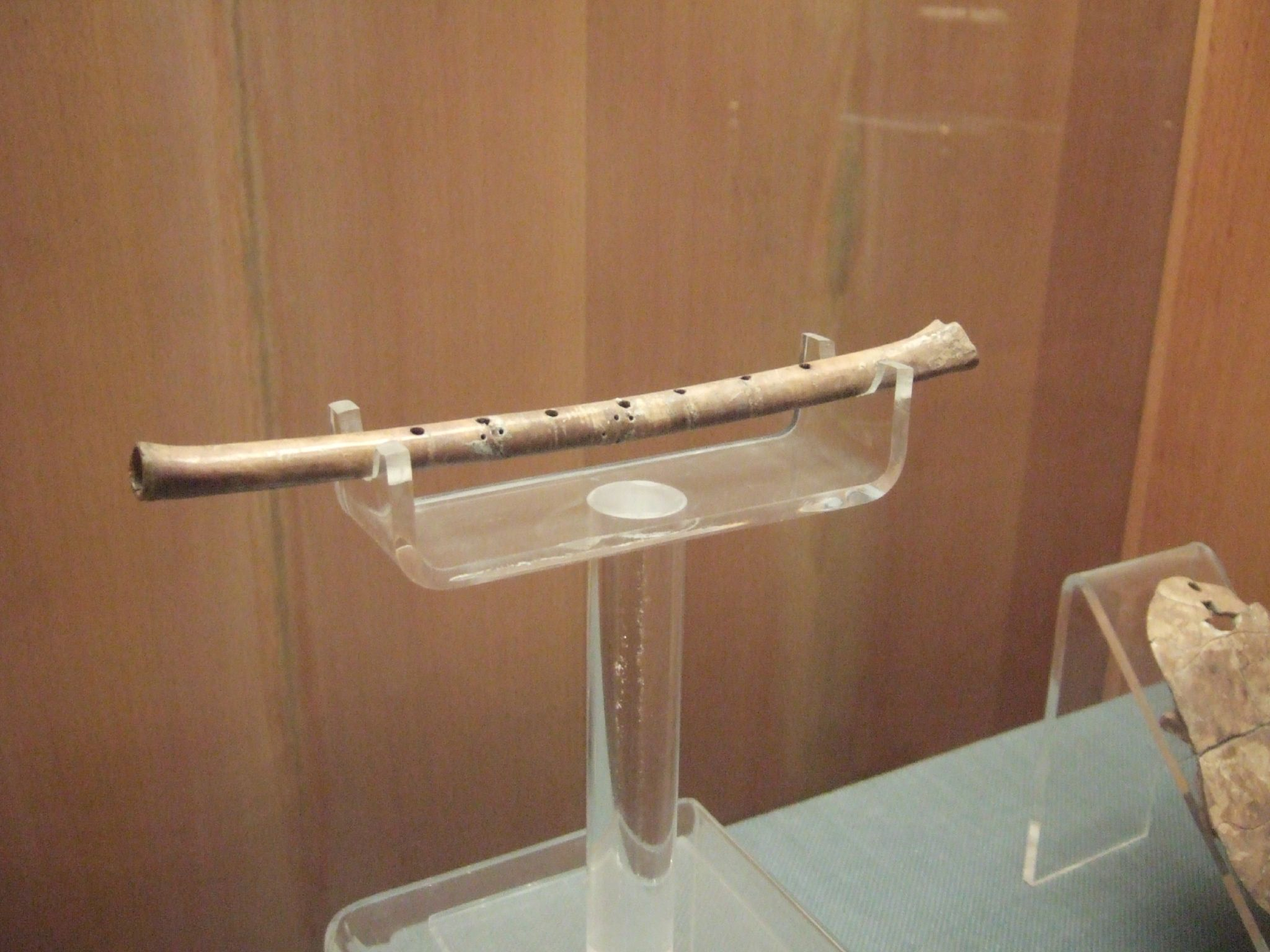

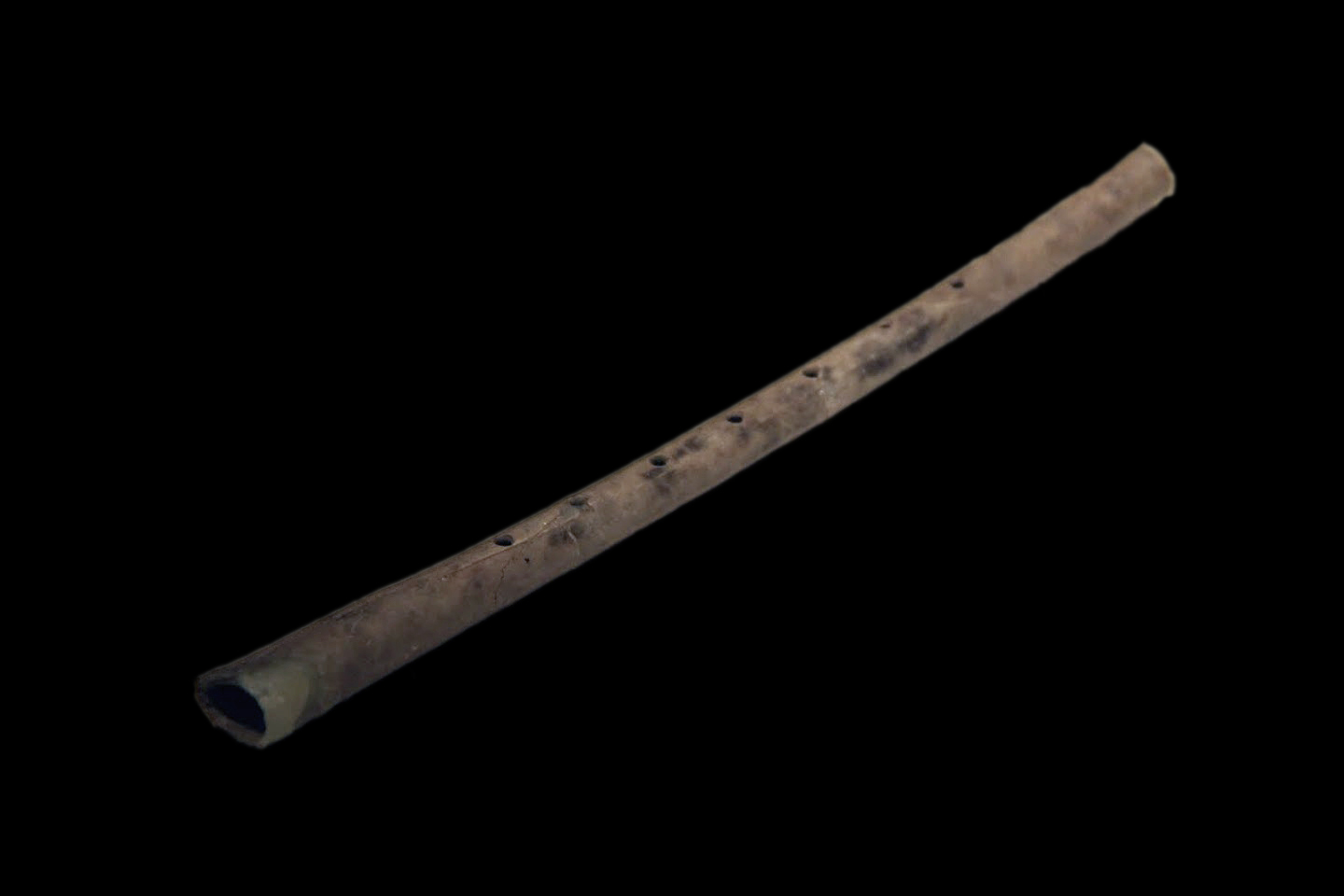

== See also ==
- Chinese flutes
- Divje Babe Flute
- Dizi
- End-blown flute
- Music of China
- Paleolithic flutes
- Traditional Chinese musical instruments

== Sources ==
1. Chang, Lulu Huang. From Confucius to Kublai Khan. Canada: The Institute of Mediaeval Music, 1993. (2-7)
2. Lee, Yuan-Yuan and Sin-Yan Shen. Chinese Musical Instruments. Chicago: Chinese Music Society of North America, 1999. (63-66)
3. Shen, Sin-Yan. China: A Journey into Its Musical Art. Chicago: Chinese Music Society of North America, 2000. (107-108)
4. So, Jenny F. ed. Music in the Age of Confucius. Washington, D.C.: Freer Gallery of Art and Arthur M Sackler Gallery, 2000. (88-90)
5. Wu, Ben. "Archaeology and History of Musical Instruments in China". The Garland Encyclopedia of World Music East Asia: China, Japan, and Korea. Vol. 7. Ed Robert C. Provine, Yosihiko Tokumaru, and J Laurence Witzleban. New York: Routledge, 2002. (105-6)
6. Zhang, Juzhong; Harbottle, Garman; Wang, Changsui; Kong, Zhaochen (September 1999). "Oldest playable musical instruments found at Jiahu early Neolithic site in China". Nature. 401 (6751): 366–368. Bibcode:1999Natur.401..366Z. doi:10.1038/43865. PMID 16862110.
