= Epic Brewing Company =

Brewing company in Auckland, New Zealand

Coordinates: 36.9490°S 174.8208°E

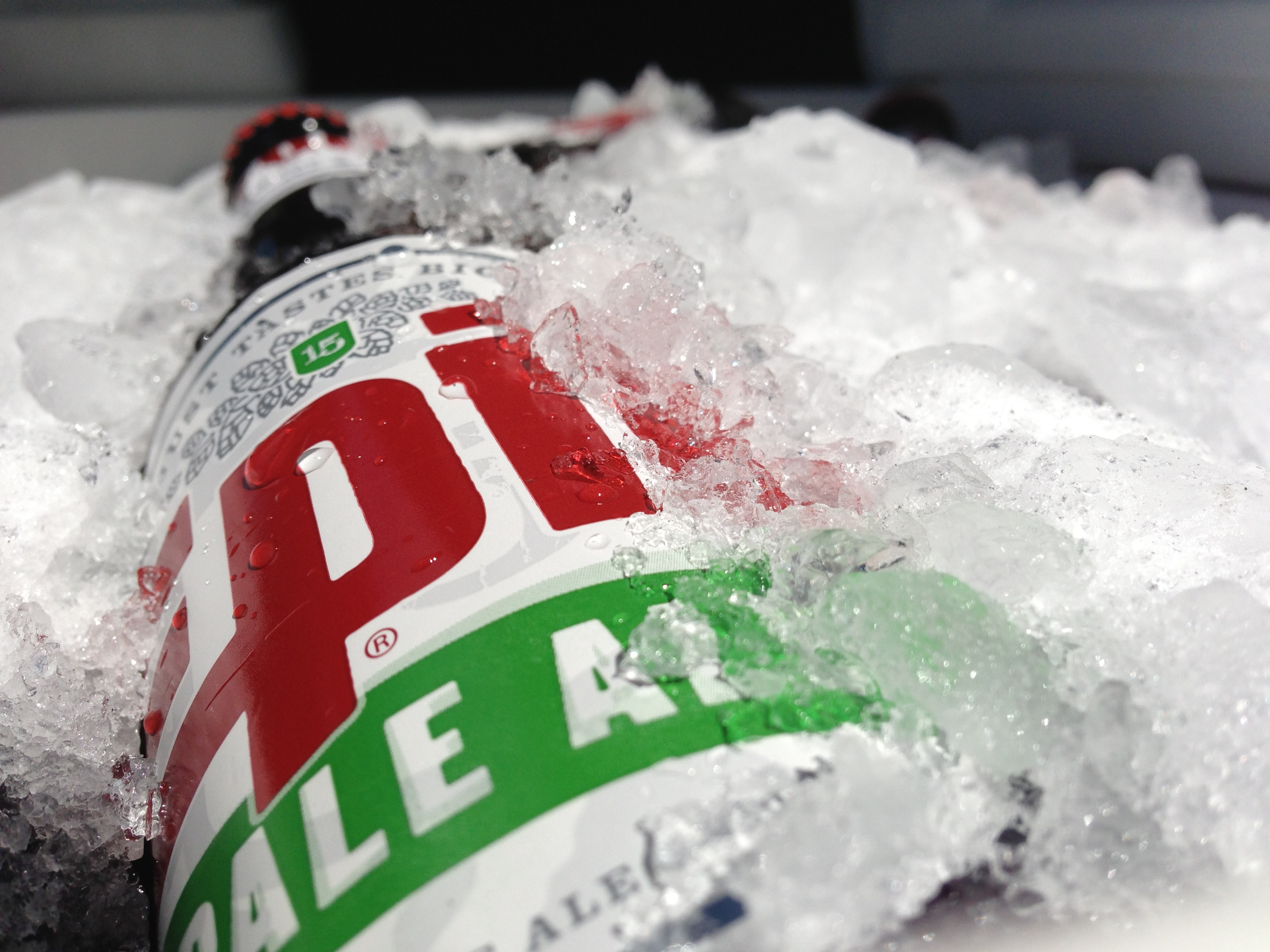
- Epic Pale Ale
- Interactive map of Epic Brewing Company
- Location: Ōtāhuhu, Auckland, New Zealand
- Opened: 2006
- Owner: Russell Group, Hancocks

Active beers
| Name | Type |
| Epic Pale Ale | American Pale Ale |
| Epic Lager | Lager |
| Epic Armageddon IPA | IPA |

Seasonal beers
| Name | Type |
| Epic Mayhem | Strong Pale Ale |
| Epic Hop Zombie | IIPA |
| Epic LARGER | Lager |
| Epic Coffee & Fig | Stout |

Other beers
| Name | Type |
Past Seasonal beers
| Epic Thornbridge Stout | Stout |
| Epic Porter 2007 | Porter |
| Epic/Dogfish Head Portamarillo | Porter |

Epic Brewing Company is a brewing company located in Ōtāhuhu, Auckland, New Zealand. Epic beers are contract brewed at Steam Brewing Company. Their beers have won several awards in New Zealand and Australia. Epic went into liquidation on 25 July 2023 and was purchased by construction company Russell Group and beverage manufacturer Hancocks on 25 August, 2023.

== Overview ==
In October 2007, Steam Brewing Company sold the Epic Brewing Company and Epic brand to Head Brewer / General Manager, Luke Nicholas. The Epic beers will continue being brewed at Steam Brewing Company.

Epic Brewing Company started exporting to Australia in May 2009, to the United States and Sweden in 2010 and to Belgium and Italy in 2011.

Nicholas was invited by Sam Calagione of Dogfish Head Brewery to brew a beer with him for the Discovery Channel series Brew Masters, where the duo concocted a beer called Portamarillo, brewed with pōhutukawa wood-smoked Tamarillo fruit.

In 2011, Kelly Ryan joined Epic and the two travelled around New Zealand, filming NZ Craft Beer TV, during which they visited 44 breweries around New Zealand. This show resulted in a collaborative recipe that they thought captured the current state of New Zealand brewing, a 6% New Zealand Pale Ale called Mash Up. Collaborating breweries were allowed input into the recipe and invited along for the brew day.

2011 also saw the release of Epic Hop Zombie, an 8.5% Double IPA, Epic LARGER, an 8.5% Imperial Pilsner and the first beer in their new Epicurean series, a Coffee & Fig Imperial Oatmeal Stout at 8% abv.

=== Liquidation and sale ===
Epic's shareholders placed Epic into liquidation on 25 July 2023 due to a number of factors. In the wake of the COVID-19 pandemic, the brewery faced falling sales and rising prices of malt, freight, packaging, excise tax, and salaries. The closure of New Zealand's two food grade carbon dioxide plants led to a nationwide CO_{2} shortage and rising CO_{2} import costs.

Epic was relying on an investor to help them with cash-flow while they worked on opening a brewery and taproom in Mount Wellington. Epic was facing inflationary pressures and a cutback in spending, while resource consent for the new venue stalled at Auckland Council. Owning a brewery would have improved margins from Epic's 2005 model of brewing under contract by freeing Epic from the need to brew in bulk, and saving money on freight and storage. The investor withdrew support and Epic was forced to abandon plans for the new brewery. The company was left with negative cashflow, no way to pay their bills, and unable to trade their way out of their financial hole.

On 25 August, 2023, construction company Russell Group and beverage manufacturer Hancocks combined to buy Epic, with Epic founders Luke and Wendy Nicholas remaining with the business.

== Awards ==
Epic Armageddon IPA

- Gold & Best in Class - 2015 Australian International Beer Awards
- Gold & Best in Class - 2011 BrewNZ Beer Awards
- Gold & Best in Class - 2011 BrewNZ Beer Awards
- Bronze - 2010 BrewNZ Beer Awards
- Gold & Best in Class - 2009 BrewNZ Beer Awards

Epic Pale Ale

- Silver - 2011 BrewNZ Beer Awards
- Bronze - 2009 BrewNZ Beer Awards
- Gold & Best in Class - 2008 BrewNZ Beer Awards
- Silver - 2007 Australian International Beer Awards
- Supreme Champion Beer - 2006 New Zealand International Beer Awards.
- Gold & Best in Class - 2006 New Zealand International Beer Awards
- Gold & Best in Class - 2006 BrewNZ Beer Awards
- Silver - 2006 Australian International Beer Awards

Epic Mayhem

- Gold - 2010 BrewNZ Beer Awards
- Silver - 2007 Australian International Beer Awards
- Bronze - 2007 BrewNZ Beer Awards
- Gold & Best in Class - 2006 BrewNZ Beer Awards

Epic Barrel Aged IPA

- Bronze - 2011 BrewNZ Beer Awards
- Gold & Best in Class - 2010 BrewNZ Beer Awards

Epic Porter

- Silver - 2007 BrewNZ Beer Awards

Epic Lager

- Silver - 2011 BrewNZ Beer Awards
- Bronze - 2009 BrewNZ Beer Awards
- Bronze - 2007 BrewNZ Beer Awards

Epic Thornbridge Stout

- Bronze - 2011 BrewNZ Beer Awards

Oak Barrel Aged Epic Thornbridge Stout

- Silver - 2011 BrewNZ Beer Awards

NZ Craft Beer TV Mash Up

- Silver - 2011 BrewNZ Beer Awards

== Accolades ==
Best Beers of Australia and New Zealand 2010 - RateBeer.com

Best Beer 2008 - Metro Magazine

Best Beer 2007 - NZ Listener

== See also ==
- Barrel-aged beer
