= Steam Brewing Company =

Brewery in Ōtāhuhu, Auckland, New Zealand

Coordinates: 36°56′55.64″S 174°49′15.47″E

- Interactive map of Steam Brewing Company
- Location: Ōtāhuhu, Auckland
- Opened: 1995

Active beers
Name	Type
Blue Goose Lager	Pale Lager
Buxom Blonde	Wheat Beer
Classic Draught	NZ Draught
Dark Star	Robust Porter
Fuggles	Best Bitter
Monk's Habit	American Red IPA

Seasonal beers
Name	Type
Belgian Pale Ale	Belgian Pale Ale
Dirty Blonde	Belgian Wit
German Pilsner	German Pilsner

Steam Brewing Company is a New Zealand microbrewery located in Ōtāhuhu, Auckland. It was founded in October 1995 as the brewery for the Cock & Bull brewpub in East Tāmaki and currently brews beers for the Cock & Bull chain of taverns, as well as the retail beer Epic Pale Ale and several contracted beers including TaaKawa Ale. and previously (till March 2005) the bottled beers for the Loaded Hog pub chain.

The original East Tāmaki location was decommissioned in September 2004, and by 2005, Cock & Bull had opened a chain of five taverns. In August 2004, Steam Brewing Company purchased Auckland Breweries to meet increased production demands. This new site contained a 200 bottle per minute glass packaging line, able to fill beer, juice, cider, energy drinks, RTDs and other cold beverages.

October 2007, Steam Brewing Company sold the Epic Brewing Company and Epic brand to then Head Brewer / General Manager, Luke Nicholas. The Epic beers continue to be brewed by Steam Brewing Company.

== Cock & Bull pubs ==
There are four Cock & Bull pubs located in Auckland and one in Hamilton.

Auckland Locations:

- Botany
- Ellerslie
- Newmarket
- Lynfield

Steam Brewing Company supplies tap beer for Foundation Bar & Restaurant in Hamilton and Szimpla Bar & Gastro at Auckland Airport under the Steam Brewing name.

== Awards ==
Steam Brewing Company's beers have won numerous awards in New Zealand and Australia. Monk's Habit was judged best in class at the 2005 Australian International Beer Awards, and won the Supreme Champion award at the 1999 and 2001 New Zealand International Beer Awards. Epic Pale Ale was named Supreme Winner at the 2006 New Zealand International Beer Awards.
