= Grain (surfboard company) =

American constructor of wooden surfboards

Grain Surfboards
- Founded: 2005
- Headquarters: York, Maine
- Products: Hollow wooden surfboards
- Website: www.grainsurfboards.com

Grain Surfboards is an American company based in York, Maine that manufactures hollow wooden surfboards. The surfboards are made primarily from northern white cedar, with some western red cedar added for color accent. Grain manufactures custom boards, as well as selling kits and offering classes where surfers can build their own boards.

== History ==
Founded in 2005 by Rich Blundell and Mike LaVecchia in York, Maine, Grain has boat building and cabinetry influences. The first of Grain's boards were designed and constructed using Blundell's "Strip and Feather" method in LaVecchia's basement. A New England magazine, N'East, featured a story about the startup, which was followed up by a report by the Associated Press in December 2005. Around the same time, Clark Foam, a major manufacturer of blank foam surfboards, shut down after disagreements with California's Environmental Protection Agency. This led surfers to rethink the environmental impact of their boards, and business at Grain picked up. Brad Anderson joined the company as co-owner, and Grain moved into a workshop at Side Hill Farm in York.

Grain has made a wooden version of Channel Islands Surfboards' 'Biscuit' since 2009. The original Biscuit won the 2008 Surf Industry Manufacturers Association Award. The Wood Biscuit is heavier than a fiberglass board, but the extra weight gives better momentum over choppy water.

Grain launched a Kickstarter campaign in 2013 to raise funds for a bus and trailer to use as a mobile workshop for board building classes. The campaign was successful, raising over $40,000 in one month. In keeping with the company's green ethos, the bus is powered by alternative fuel.

In 2017 Grain had to leave the workshop they had rented for over a decade. They crowdfunded a deposit for the purchase of a new workshop, but ultimately were unable to raise sufficient funds to buy the property. Later in 2017, Grain was one of the founder members of the nonprofit trade group Maine Outdoor Brands.

In 2018, Grain partnered with the Glenmorangie distillery create a limited edition of boards made from whisky barrels. The board was made from Glenmorangie's whisky barrels, along with reclaimed western red cedar and Maine-grown northern white cedar. Each board contained twelve barrel staves, which is half of a whisky barrel.

== Production ==
New designs are drawn using 3D cad software. Each board has an internal wooden frame onto which planks are glued before being sanded into shape. The frame forms the backbone of the hollow board and is intricately designed like an airplane wing. It takes up to 60 hours to construct a board, with many tiny pieces of wood used. The final step is to finish the board with fiberglass cloth and epoxy resin, which is necessary to prevent the wood from soaking up water.

The wood used to craft the boards is white cedar, grown locally in Maine, and sustainably harvested. Left-over wood is not wasted; shavings are collected for use as animal bedding, and off-cuts are used to make sea-sleds or skateboards.

== Customer engagement ==
As of 2018, Grain had over 50,000 followers on Instagram, 12,000 on Facebook, and more than 7,000 newsletter subscribers. Grain's website and social media presence have been praised as an example of using open communication on the internet to spread ideas and create customers. As people attend classes with Grain and build their own boards, they share images of this on social media, which fuels further interest in Grain's surfboards.
