= Yu Xunfa =

Chinese flautist (1946–2006)

- Born: January 8, 1946; Shanghai, China
- Died: January 21, 2006 (aged 60); Shanghai, China
- Genres: World music
- Instrument(s): Dizi, koudi
- Labels: China Record Corporation

Yu Xun-fa (俞遜發; January 8, 1946 – January 21, 2006) was a Chinese flutist who invented the wind instrument known as the koudi.

Born in Shanghai, he popularized the art of the flute in Chinese culture during the 1970s.

In elementary school, Yu studied Chinese flute. He participated in the Shanghai "Red Children" Troupe in 1958, and studied under dizi performer Lu Chunling as a disciple.

In 1971, Yu invented koudi, a small flute made from bamboo. During the 1970s, he was most active; touring parts of Europe, Canada, and Asia. He died January 21, 2006, aged 60, from liver cancer.

== Discography ==
- Zhu: Symphonic Fantasia - In Memory of Martyrs for Truth; Sketches in the Mountains of Guizhou; Symphony No. 4 (1995)
- Lake View on a Moonlit Autumn Night (1996)
- MASTERPIECES on Chinese Wind Instruments: A Visit to Suzhou (2004)
- Master of Chinese Traditional Music: Di Flute Perform Fish Xunfa (2005)
- Song Of Plum Blossom (2006)

=== Compilations ===
- Treasure of Traditional Music Vol. 3 (1997)
- Anthology Of Chinese Traditional and Folk Music: DIZI Vol. 5 (1994)
