= Koudi =

Small Chinese bamboo flute

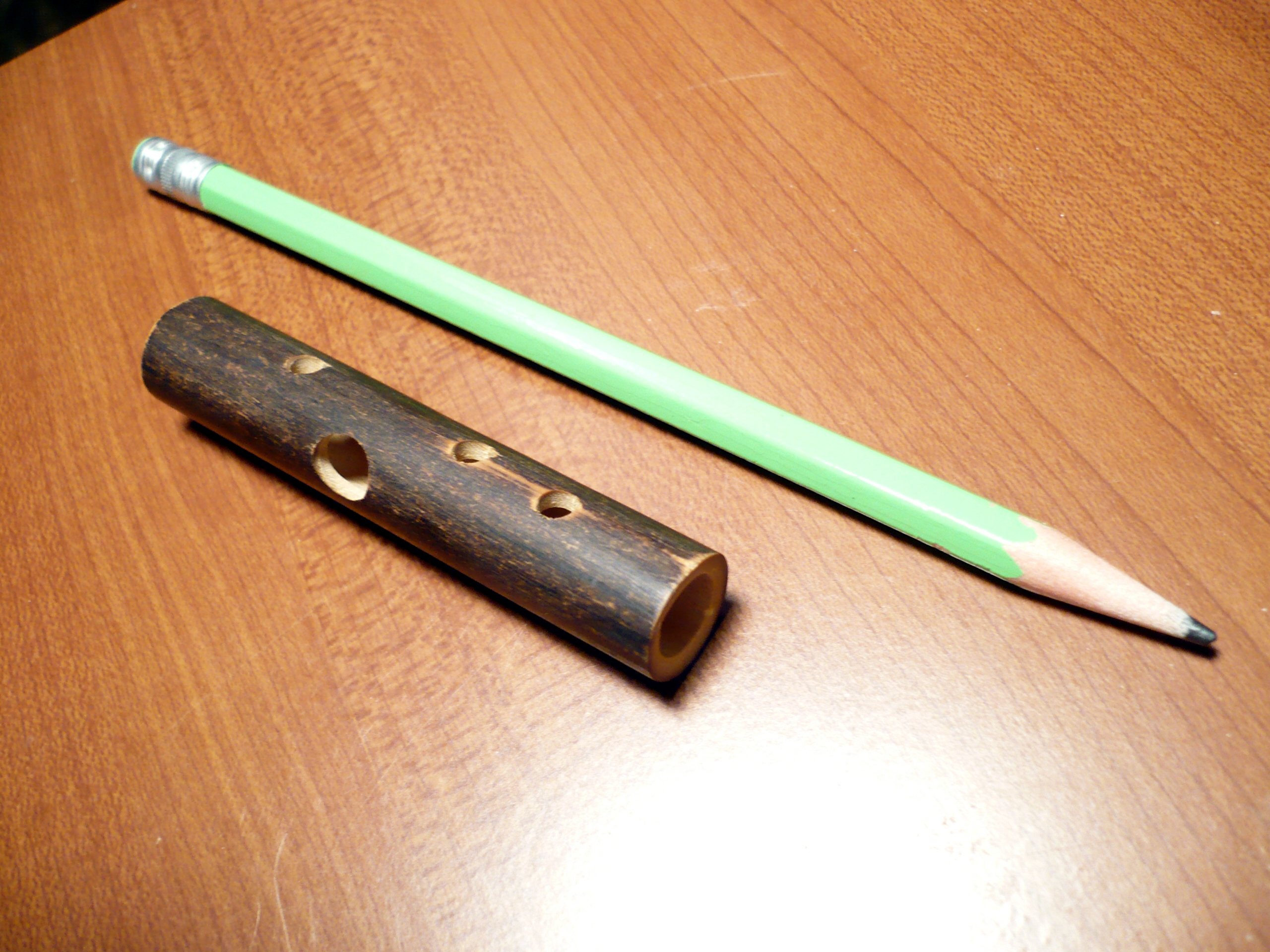
- A koudi. The large hole in the middle is the blowing hole, and the three smaller holes on the top are finger holes. The two open ends of the tube are also used, played with the thumbs.

Koudi
- Classification: Aerophone
- Hornbostel–Sachs classification: (Flute)
- Inventor: Yu Xunfa

The koudi (Chinese: 口笛; pinyin: kǒudí also spelled kou di) is a very small Chinese flute made from bamboo. It is the smallest flute in the Chinese flute family. Its original shape derives from prehistorical instruments made with animal bone, but the modern koudi is made with wood, bamboo or PVC. It was invented in 1971 by dizi master Yu Xunfa (俞逊发, 1946–2006).

== Overview ==
In 1971, the Chinese Flute player Yu Xunfa, who was inspired by original prehistorical instrument, made the first Koudi. This instrument contains one octave, and two years later this instrument went to public by playing the recomposed Romanian folk song Ciocârlia (云雀). After that, to expand the range, Xu made the five-hole Koudi, and Bai Chengren (白诚仁) composed Morning of A Miao Village 苗岭的早晨 (MaoLing de ZaoChen). The instrument comes in two sizes. The smaller size, called gaoyin koudi, which is only 5–6 cm in length, has only the holes on the sides, where the thumbs can control the full range of pitch by incrementally opening the holes. The larger size, referred to as zhongyin koudi, is 8–9 cm long and has an additional 2–4 holes on the front (played with the fingers, these holes give slightly more precision to pitch changes). The gaoyin koudi is pitched an octave above the xiao di, whereas the zhongyin koudi is pitched an octave above the bang di. The range of the koudi is about a ninth or tenth, and it can bend notes over the entire range of the instrument.

A related instrument in Hunnan province called the tuliang is also center-blown and open-ended but is much larger (about the size of the qudi).

== Basic skills ==
Basically, a Koudi has two octaves.

== Audio sample ==
MiaoLing de ZaoChen by Yu Xunfa

== Notable players ==
Notable koudi players include:

- Yu Xunfa (俞逊发) (1946–2006), in China
- Zhan Yongming (詹永明) (1957-), in China

== See also ==
- Dizi
- Chinese flutes
- Traditional Chinese musical instruments
- Bamboo musical instruments
