= Jiahu =

Neolithic culture in China

- 賈湖 (Chinese)
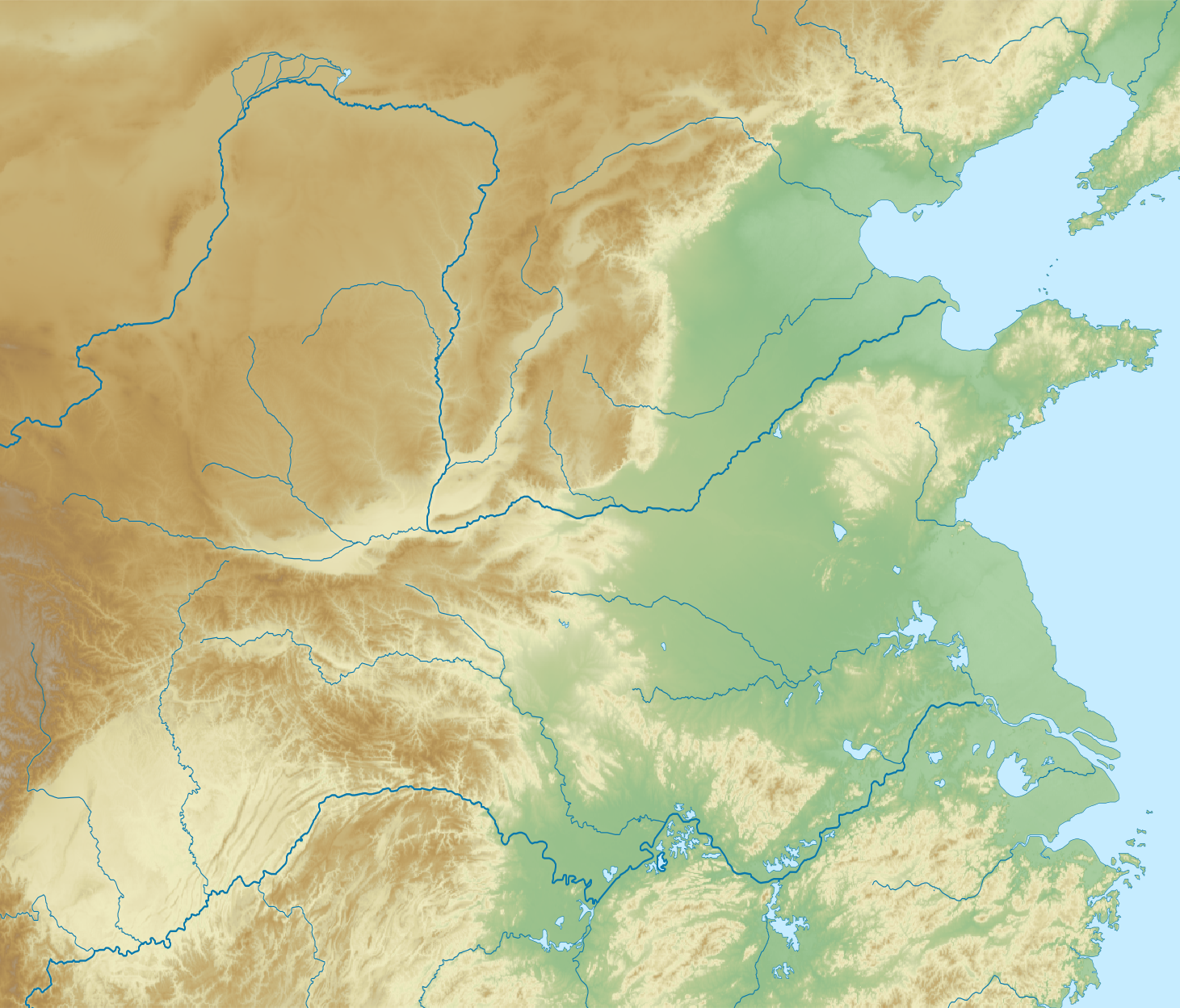
- Location in northern China
- 33.613°N 113.667°E
- Cultures: Peiligang culture
- Location: China
- Region: Henan

History
- Built: c. 7000 BC
- Abandoned: c. 5700 BC

Jiahu (Chinese: 賈湖) was the site of a Neolithic settlement based in the central plain of ancient China, near the Yellow River. It is located between the floodplains of the Ni River to the north, and the Sha River to the south, 22 km (14 mi) north of modern Wuyang in Henan. Most archaeologists consider the site to be one of the earliest examples of the Peiligang culture. Settled c. 7000 BC, the site was later flooded and abandoned around 5700 BC. The settlement was surrounded by a moat and covered a relatively large area of 55,000 square metres (5.5 ha). At one time, it was "a complex, highly organized Chinese Neolithic society", with a population of between 250 and 800 people.

The important discoveries of the Jiahu archaeological site include the Jiahu symbols, possibly an early example of proto-writing, carved into tortoise shells and bones. The Jiahu flutes are believed to be among the oldest playable musical instruments in the world, comprising 33 pieces carved from the wing bones of cranes. There is also evidence of alcohol production through the fermentation of rice, honey, and hawthorn leaves.

Diverse artifacts are attested at the site, including residences, burial sites, pottery kilns, assorted stone and earthen implements, and a large central structure believed to be a communal workspace. These indicate a fairly advanced settlement for the early Neolithic period. To date, 45 residences have been excavated at Jiahu, with most measuring between four and ten meters. Most of these were partially dug into the earth and featured a single room, though some were later expanded to have multiple rooms. Garbage pits and storage cellars have also been excavated.

== Discovery and excavation ==
Discovered by Zhu Zhi in 1962, extensive excavation of the site did not occur until the 1980s. Most of the site still has not been excavated, although work is slowly progressing. The excavation of Jiahu burial sites and rubbish pits has been productive, yielding abundant evidence about the lives of the Jiahu people. Chinese researchers from the Henan Provincial Institute of Cultural Relics and Archaeology, led for many years by Zhang Juzhong, a professor from the University of Science and Technology of China, have carried out archaeological research around the site for decades.

Zhang's team conducted excavation of portions of the site in seven stages; each stage took two to three years. A large portion of the Jiahu site was excavated in the first two phases of the project, between 1983 and 1987. Zhang and his assistants published the findings of the first two phases in detail in the journal Antiquity.

== Relationship to Peiligang ==
Some archaeologists point to cultural distinctions between Jiahu and Peiligang, as well as the distance: Jiahu is isolated, many kilometers south of the larger Peiligang grouping of over 100 archaeological sites in a fairly compact area. The distance would have represented a journey on foot of several days in the Neolithic era. This school of thought suggests that Jiahu and Peiligang represented separate, neighboring cultures that interacted and shared many characteristics. Other early Neolithic settlements in this part of the world were much farther south and east.

Archaeologists have divided Jiahu into three distinct phases. The earliest phase spans from 7000 to 6600 BC, the middle phase spans from 6600 to 6200 BC; and the latest phase spans from 6200 to 5700 BC. The last two phases correspond to the Peiligang culture, while the earliest phase is unique to Jiahu.

Careful examination of the skeletons of over 400 individuals, removed from more than 300 graves, by several scientific teams over the course of the past 30 years illustrates that the Jiahu ethnic group was a part of the Northern Mongoloid group, and identified closely with the Miaodigou and Xiawanggang sub-groups which were also descendants of hunter-gatherers in modern Henan, and the Dawenkou, Xixiahou and Yedian sub-groups that were later found in Shandong Province.

== Agriculture, hunting, fishing and foraging ==
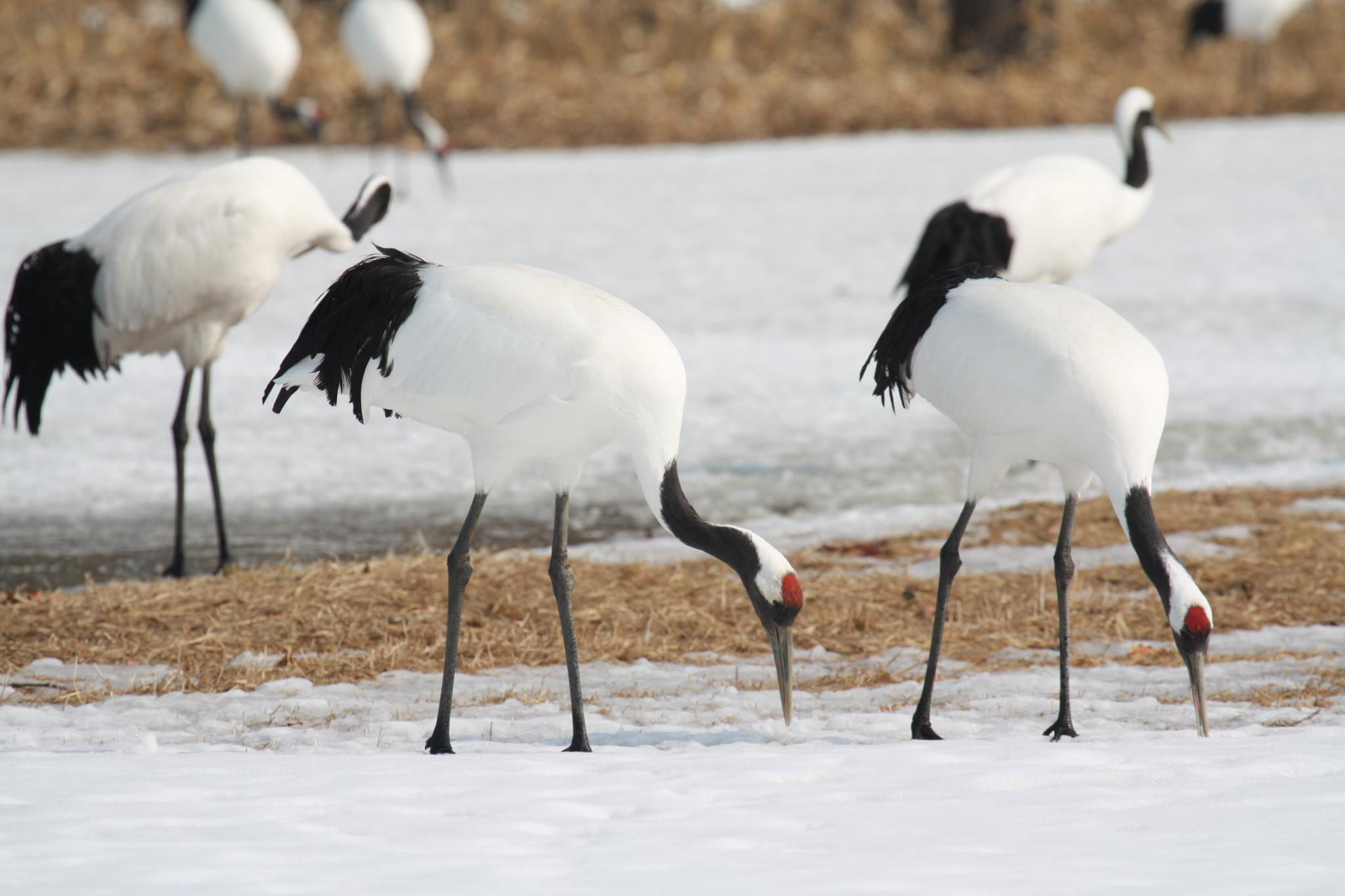
Red-crowned cranes in Hokkaido. Currently an endangered species, they were plentiful throughout the East Asia region in the Neolithic period and were hunted for meat; their wing bones were used to produce the Jiahu flutes.

The inhabitants of Jiahu cultivated foxtail millet and rice. While millet cultivation is common in the Peiligang culture, rice cultivation at Jiahu is unique, and tends to support the theory that Jiahu was a separate culture from the Peiligang grouping. On the other hand, difference in local climate, moisture and soil conditions may have made cultivating rice in the Peiligang area more difficult. Jiahu rice cultivation is one of the earliest found, and the most northerly found at such an early stage in history. The rice was a kind of short-grained japonica rice. Scholars had previously thought the earliest domesticated rice belonged to the long-grain indica subspecies.

There is abundant proof of millet farming in cool, dry high latitudes of the Yellow River Valley, and rice farming dominated in warm, moist low latitudes of the Yangtze River Valley. The early Neolithic site of Jiahu lies near the boundary between the cool, dry north and the warm, moist south. In another sign of advancement, Jiahu's farmers had moved on from the usual slash-and-burn techniques of Neolithic farmers, and were using intensive cultivation in permanent fields. Jiahu is also the site of the earliest find of wild soybean seeds in China; a large quantity of soybean remains were discovered at Jiahu.

Food was plentiful, from farming as well as hunting and foraging, and contributed to considerable population growth for such an early settlement. Women of the Jiahu culture gathered wild pears and apricots, and foraged for acorns, chestnuts, broad beans, edible roots and tubers in the surrounding countryside. There is evidence of domesticated pigs, dogs, poultry, and small numbers of cattle. The Jiahu people used manure from their pigs and cattle as fertilizer, substantially increasing the yield of their rice crops. The livestock produced meat, milk and eggs. There was also evidence of deer, wild boar and rabbit hunting, and fishing in the nearby rivers to the north and south, with nets made of hemp fibers. The earliest evidence of Common carp aquaculture was also found at Jiahu. The red-crowned crane, a large bird indigenous to the region, was hunted for meat; its bones and feathers were also used for other purposes.

Due to this steadily improving and varied diet, the health and longevity of the Jiahu people gradually improved. This has been documented through comparison of the archaeological evidence. Over 400 burials have been unearthed at Jiahu, and many hundreds more are believed to await excavation. Skeletons have been measured and carefully examined, revealing the height, weight, gender, and approximate age of each of the deceased Jiahu at the time of death, as well as the general health, and in many cases the cause of death. The three phases of Jiahu history correspond to steadily increasing numbers of middle-aged and older people, suggesting an increase in survival and life expectancy, and fewer remains of children and infants, suggesting a reduction in child and infant mortality. By the third phase, the average height of an adult had increased by two centimetres (3/4 in) and the bones and teeth were in significantly better condition.

== Tools and fortifications ==
A stone sickle blade has been recovered. This was secured to a wooden handle to harvest grain. Evidence of baskets woven from wild grass has been uncovered. These were used to carry grain from the harvests. Remnants of a spinning loom have been found, indicating the production of cloth, probably from hemp fibers. Among the many tools and utensils unearthed at Jiahu are three-legged earthenware cooking pots with tight-fitting lids, and a variety of stone implements, including arrowheads, barbed harpoons, spades, axes, awls, and chisels.

Stone spearheads have also been found, and evidence of what may have been a wooden stockade fence along at least a portion of the interior shore of the moat. These improved weapons, and the moat surrounding the settlement, provided an ideal defense for such an early culture. The area is known to have been frequented by nomadic hunting and gathering tribes for several thousand years prior to the Jiahu settlement, and these may have been potential enemies, as well as the genetic forebears of Jiahu. The Jiahu people are not believed to have been warlike in nature, but capable of defending themselves if the need arose.

Examination of the site has revealed no evidence of armed conflict. Unearthed human remains showing signs of violent death are very rare, and scattered along the known timeline—rather than occurring at the same time which would indicate a battle. It is possible that the large size of the settlement, its substantial defenses, and the improved weapons of the Jiahu people may have caused potential enemies of that time to keep their distance. Such a scenario is consistent with the substantial growth in population and longevity exhibited by the Jiahu site. Without war, and with plenty of nutritious food, the village flourished.

== Cultural evidence ==
After a thorough study of 238 skeletal remains, Harvard University forensic archaeologist Barbara Li Smith published findings that the Jiahu villagers enjoyed fairly good health. The average age of death by the third phase was around 40, representing a very good life expectancy for Neolithic people. Sponge lesions on the skulls indicate that anemia and iron deficiency were a problem. Hole bone lesions from disease and parasitic infections were rare, although fecal evidence indicated the occasional presence of hookworm parasites, possibly from poorly cooked pork.

=== Ceremonial burial ===
The burials at Jiahu were usually accompanied by burial offerings, with increasing frequency as the second and third phases progressed. Burial objects range from pottery to tortoise shells. Burial offerings varied between individuals, and are believed to be linked to the skills they displayed in life, providing evidence of an early specialization of labor. The types of labor specialization, from most common to most rare, included farmers, herdsmen, fishermen, hunters, potters, musicians, and a tribal priest.

Most of the burials were earthen pits; infants were buried in earthenware jars. As is common with Neolithic communities, the burials were in cemeteries which were separate from the residential areas, although many grave sites overlapped, so they were probably not marked. A few burials were multiple, while most burial pits contained single individuals. These did not follow any discernible pattern, although it is possible that in some cases, man–woman couples of roughly the same age were buried together.

In some graves the heads were severed from the body and pointed toward the northwest. Cut marks made when the bones were fresh indicates the heads were cut off shortly after the person died. A few burial offerings included turquoise carvings, and represented a significant level of material wealth, suggesting some differences in social status. Burial offerings in women's graves were more sparse, indicating lower social status, and indicated that their roles were limited to childbearing and child care, cooking, and foraging for food.

=== Flutes ===
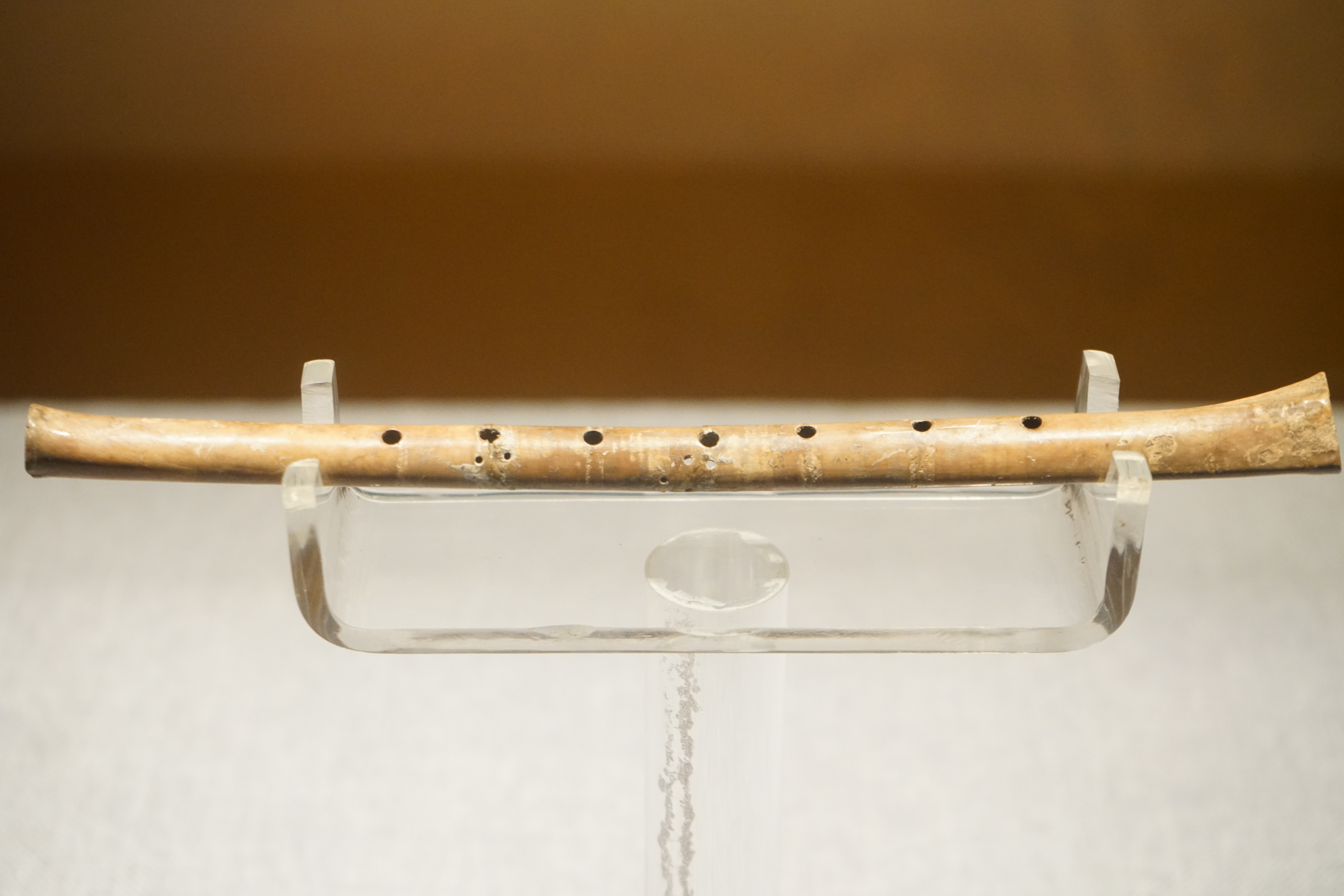
The Gudi flute on display at the Henan Museum

Some of the most significant burial offerings discovered were playable tonal flutes made from red-crowned crane wing bones. This crane is 1.5 metres (5 ft) tall with a wingspan of 2.4 m (8 ft), yielding large bones for this purpose. The first of the flutes were found in the late 1980s, but were not described in the West until 1999. In total, 33 flutes have been found at Jiahu—around 20 are intact, with the rest being broken, fragmentary, and unfinished. All are between 18 and 25 cm (7 and 10 in) in length.

The oldest phase at Jiahu only contains two flutes, which are tetratonic and pentatonic; the middle phase at Jiahu contains several flutes, including an interesting pair of hexatonic flutes. One of the flutes was broken, and the other flute seems to be a replica of the first flute, as it shows evidence of adjustments made to match the pitch of the first. Innovations in the last phase include the use of heptatonic flutes. The flutes were cut, smoothed at the ends, polished and finally drilled with a row of holes on one side. One of the broken flutes was repaired by drilling fourteen tiny holes along the breakage lines and then tying the sections together with hemp string.

The flutes play in the so-called pentatonic scale, in which octaves are divided into five notes—the basis of many kinds of music, including Chinese folk music. The fact that the flute has a scale indicates that its original players played music rather than just single notes. The flutes were probably used in some kind of ceremonial capacity, but may have been played for entertainment.

=== Pottery and alcohol production ===
Jiahu yielded some of the oldest Chinese pottery yet found in Neolithic China. Patrick McGovern, of the University of Pennsylvania Museum, led a team of scientists who applied biomarker chemical analysis to pottery jars from Jiahu. They found signature molecules proving alcohol was fermented from rice, honey, grapes, and hawthorn. Researchers hypothesize that this hybrid beverage (a beer, wine, and mead combination) was fermented by the process of mold saccharification, a uniquely Chinese contribution to the art of beverage-making in which several mold species are used to break down the carbohydrates of rice and other grains into simple, fermentable sugars. Specific aromatic herbs and flowers such as chrysanthemum, in addition to tree resins such as China fir, had been added to the hybrid beverages, the researchers found. These aromatic additions, as well as the honey, indicate that fermented beverages with a pleasing aroma and sweet taste were important to the Jiahu people.

Substantial quantities of rice and millet were stored in pottery jars, enabling the specialization of labor. Jiahu society is believed to have been fairly egalitarian, with several hundred residents of the village at the height of its development. Comparative DNA evidence from remains in the Jiahu settlement itself, as well as other evidence gathered, leads to speculation among researchers that there were one or more other ancient villages nearby, with peaceful interaction with the Jiahu in some form; but the sites of other villages nearby have not been located.

=== Inscriptions ===
Eleven pictographic symbols were discovered at the site, with nine carved into tortoise shells, and two carved into bone. These have been taken by some as possible evidence for the use of proto-writing. Correspondences between the Jiahu symbols and the characters attested much later in the oracle bone script of the Late Shang (c. 1250 – c. 1050 BC) have been noted; however, such correspondences are generally not considered strong evidence of a relationship due to the strongly representational style of each.

== End of habitation ==
Based on the archaeological evidence, a severe flood from the nearby rivers submerged most or all of the Jiahu settlement under a few feet of water sometime around 5700 BC. The inhabitants evacuated, but it is not known where they went. The absence of tools and weapons in most of the residences indicates that they were able to salvage most of their belongings. They may have built a new village that has not been discovered, emigrated to the Peiligang villages, or scattered.

Zhang Juzhong imagines that they were led by their tribal priest to build a new village nearby on higher ground, so that they could send salvage parties to the old village site. The new village site has never been found. The demolishing of older structures to salvage materials for the construction of new ones may have eradicated the site of the new village if it existed.

== See also ==
- Gudi (instrument)
- Neolithic signs in China
- Undeciphered writing systems
