= Neolithic in China =

Chinese historical period

The Neolithic in China corresponds, within the territory of present-day China, to an economic revolution during which populations learned to produce their food resources through the domestication of plants and animals. Around 9700 BCE, climate warming led to the development of wild food resources and a reduction in nomadism. Hunter-gatherers moved less; they began to store supplies, often stocks of acorns. Neolithization, which marks the transition to the Neolithic period, mainly occurred between 7000 and 5000 BCE. The appearance of pottery (c. 16000–12000 BCE) is separate from this process, as it occurred earlier, among populations of the Late Paleolithic. The Neolithic period began during a generally warm climatic phase called the Holocene. Among plant-based foods, wild rice appeared and was gradually domesticated in the Lower Yangtze region around 6000–5000 BCE; the same occurred in the Yellow River basin (Henan) with millet. Millet and rice, initially gathered and consumed in their wild forms, were progressively domesticated around 6000–5000 BCE. At first, they only made a minor contribution to the diet, competing with other wild plants and hunting resources. Underground silos were often used to store certain plant-based foods. Then, from around 5000 BCE, agriculture became a much more significant part of the diet of Chinese populations, with millet in the North and rice in the South.

Chinese prehistoric cultures thus reveal a rich material culture. Pottery appeared particularly early and achieved a high level of refinement during this period. Jades followed, as did the first lacquered objects (Hemudu culture), which also appeared here. Neolithic artisans adopted glass technology through trade with the West, but this production remained very marginal. Few wooden objects have survived, but they generally indicate everyday use. In addition to these wooden objects, others made from natural fibers, basketry materials, and horns have survived locally. Many prestige objects show hybrid forms, and their creators produced a wide variety. This abundant production offers evidence of symbolic activity that would accompany the economic development of the Bronze Age in China.

== Toward the Neolithic ==
=== Climate warming ===
While around 14000 BCE, China was a cold and dry environment, and the sea level was more than 100 meters below today's level, around 9700 BCE the Holocene began, marked by the warming of continental air masses and the influence of a stronger monsoon. During the Holocene climatic optimum, temperatures were 1 to 3 °C warmer than today, the monsoon was stronger, and lake levels were significantly higher. Northern and northwestern regions experienced heavy monsoon rains by around 7000 BCE, whereas today they are arid or semi-arid regions. These northward monsoon advances facilitated the first Neolithic settlements along the Liao River (Xinglongwa culture), the middle Yellow River (Peiligang and Cishan, Laoguantai / Baijia-Dadiwan I), and its lower course (Houli culture).

=== Cold and dry periods ===
This southeast monsoon push later receded south of the Yangtze between 4000 and 1000 BCE, bringing about a cooler and drier period in the north and wetter conditions in the south. This forced some populations to abandon settlements, population density declined, and some cultures disappeared, such as the Hongshan culture, which collapsed around 3000 BCE, replaced by a form of extensive pastoralism, or the peaceful Yangshao culture, which gave way to the Longshan culture, marked by the gradual emergence of social hierarchies and the construction of defensive ditches.

Elsewhere, walls and ditches were built to control flooding, as excavations have revealed in the Daxi, Qujialing, Shijiahe, and Liangzhu cultures. In southeastern China and Taiwan, the same phenomenon is observed: the sea level reached approximately its current level around 5500 BCE, then reached a maximum between 4000 and 2500 BCE.

In the 2000s, several studies provided more precise information on these periods on a global scale: around 6200, 3200, and 2200 BCE. Each episode lasted several hundred years. In China, these fluctuations were detected, but their dating varies significantly from one author to another, which could result from a strong interaction between the specific effects of climate change on a global scale and the geographical and regional characteristics specific to China in its distinctly different regions. The aforementioned studies seem to demonstrate that these fluctuations were at the origin of millet cultivation and that elsewhere, the social response consisted in a strengthening of community cohesion and the collective appropriation of certain territories by these communities. These cold and dry periods alternated with others that were warmer and more humid.

The first postglacial shock, around 6400–6000 BCE, produced an arid and cold period in the North Atlantic, North America, Africa, and Asia. In China, a similar fluctuation, around 5300 BCE, a period of drought, could explain why only a few sites dating back to before 6000 BCE have been discovered, located in well-watered valleys: Xinglonggou in the Liao River Valley, as well as the earliest sites of Peiligang in the Huang Huai Valley, (Note: The Huang River is a tributary of the Huai River, in Henan, which flows into Huangchuang.) and a few sites of Pengtoushan in the Yangzi River Valley. After these cold and dry episodes, the return of rains and the monsoon corresponds to the development of Neolithic cultures and their spread from north to south.

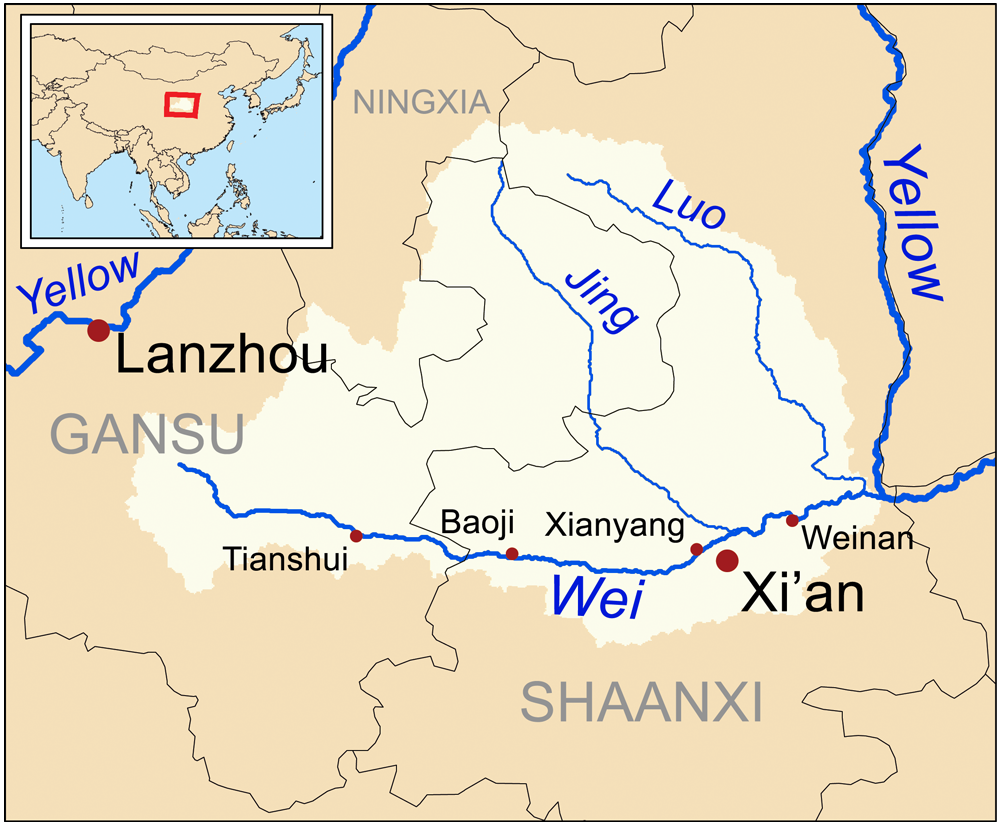
The course of the Wei River, a tributary of the Yellow River, in northern China

=== Variations ===
To give a revealing example of the effects of climate, the vast lands located north of the lower part of the Wei River were, it seems, covered by vegetation and deep lakes, and a large part of this region was likely uninhabited. At the same time, small areas increasingly populated began to multiply here and there, with all the practices typical of the Neolithic: a production-based economy, followed by rivalries over possession of the most fertile areas.

While the transition toward certain aspects of the Neolithic occurred slowly in some places, and without local continuity, in many other regions the practices of hunter-gatherers (as at Zengpiyan) from the Epipaleolithic tradition continued well into the Holocene, among populations that had already entered the Neolithic (cultivation and animal husbandry). (Note: Brian Hayden (Simon Fraser University) [in Archambault de Beaune, Sophie (2007). "Une société hiérarchique ou égalitaire" [A hierarchical or egalitarian society]. CNRS éditions (in French): 197–206.] indicates that the presence of storage pits (which could be signs of property) and the fact that certain individuals are distinguished by their burials and ornaments [as can be observed in China at least by this period, if not earlier] may be indications of social or cultural differences, or of certain forms of complexity within these hunter-gatherer cultures, since the Upper Paleolithic.)

=== Neolithization ===
At the beginning of the Holocene (9700–7000 BCE), in a context of abundant and stable resources, groups of hunter-gatherers reduced their mobility and adopted more diversified strategies to exploit these various local resources. Gradually, and depending on the location, new practices emerged, from foraging and gathering—becoming more selective (as in South China)—sometimes involving partial sedentarization, to new types of production such as pottery. (Note: On this topic: Note 31.) This pottery appeared alongside rare polished stone tools, within subsistence strategies that still belonged to the Late Paleolithic.

Neolithization is a complex process. In a landscape whose vegetation cover had changed, humans employed diverse strategies depending on local and temporal conditions. This neolithization is marked by the progressive sedentarization of human groups and the establishment of food reserves during the Early Neolithic (7000–5000 BCE).

Neolithization, a slow and uneven process, is difficult to grasp when it comes to small groups whose strategies vary depending on the areas they encounter (as mobile hunter-gatherers) and local climatic variations. The difficulty also lies in trying to connect population movements (human migrations in Southeast Asia and connections with East Asia and the Pacific), linguistic histories (such as the expansion of Austronesian languages), technological changes indicating new economic or social adaptations (pottery, basic technologies, sedentarization), and evidence of domestication of animals and plants. This effort has created the illusion of a unified "neolithization" process, rather than acknowledging the complex histories of mosaics of peoples practicing eclectic strategies that cannot be easily classified as either hunter-gatherers or farmers.

Polished stones seem to be associated with agriculture, in the case of grinding stones used to crush grains, but plants were already being crushed before that. However, flaked stone tools continued to be used for a long time, depending on the intended purpose. The intellectual processes involved are therefore complex, and it seems that some individuals distinguished themselves from their peers and entered into rivalry during this period. Furthermore, these societies came into contact with hunter-gatherers, and such exchanges were beneficial to both sides, transforming them reciprocally.

Domestication of certain animals, cultivation of cereals and other plants, new tools—the essential traits of Neolithic culture—developed independently of one another, both in time and space, and exchanges with even the most distant cultures played a role in this slow and dispersed neolithization. Neolithic cultures, from 7000 to 1500 BCE, within which these practices continued to evolve, formed locally and sometimes disappeared, often witnessing—more or less gradually—the emergence of social differences and violent conflicts.

=== In the South ===
The Zengpiyan and Miaoyan caves (Guilin, Guangxi) (10000–6000 BCE) provide a clearer view of these populations in this region during that period: they were seasonal camps, but the production and use of pottery, in the early stages of this technology, suggest that occupation periods were relatively long, and with a well-organized logistical supply system, these populations were not forced to make long migrations. The appearance of pottery (10000–8000 BCE), hand-molded, occurred within these non-sedentary hunter-gatherer populations. The Zengpiyan site was used up to the neolithization period: at the end of the cave's occupation period, pottery made with the coil technique, decorated, appeared, and polished stones emerged—although the people involved were still hunter-gatherers.

=== In the North ===
Publications dating from 2013 report the domestication of livestock near Harbin, around 8000 BCE.

== Table of Neolithic cultures ==
In this chronological table of Neolithic cultures, innovations have been indicated. China has been divided into nine regions:

1. Northeast China: Inner Mongolia, Heilongjiang, Jilin, and Liaoning.
1. Northwest China (Upper Yellow River): Gansu, Qinghai, and western Shaanxi.
1. North-Central China (Middle Yellow River): Shanxi, Hebei, western Henan, and eastern Shaanxi, corresponding to the Central Plain.
1. Eastern China (Lower Yellow River): Shandong, Anhui, northern Jiangsu, and eastern Henan.
1. Southeastern China (Lower Yangtze): Zhejiang and Jiangsu.
1. South-Central China (Middle Yangtze): Hubei and the northern part of Hunan.
1. Sichuan and Upper Yangtze region.
1. Southeastern China: Fujian, Jiangxi, Guangdong, Guangxi, and the southern part of Hunan, the lower Xi River up to northern Vietnam, and the island of Taiwan.
1. Southwestern China: Yunnan and Guizhou.

Period (BCE)	Northeast China (1)	Northwest China (2)	Middle Yellow River (Zhongyuan) (3)	Lower Yellow River (4)	Lower Yangzi (5)	Middle Yangzi (6)	Sichuan (7)	Southeast China (8)	Southwest China (9)
					since 9000 BCE
7000 BCE			Peiligang		Shangshan	Pengtoushan
						(including
					(rice	Chengbeixi
6500 BCE		Dadiwan I		Houli	on path to	and Zaoshi)		Zengpiyan
	Xinglongwa	Baijia	Cishan	6500–5500 BCE	domestication)	7000–5800 BCE		7000–5500 BCE
	6200–5400 BCE	= Laoguantai	(Jiahu)	Collection, hunting, fishing		domestication:		Dingsishan
6000 BCE	Cultivated millet	6500–5000 BCE	(Lijiacun)	+ small-scale farming	Kuahuqiao	(rice + animals)		Baozitou
	Cord-marked	Durable	6500-5000 AEC		6000-5000 AEC			6000–5000 BCE
	ceramics:	ceramics	domestication:		(rice:			Hunter-gatherers:
5500 BCE			millet		domestication			shells + plants
			+ dog and pig	Beixin
	Xinle			5300–4500 BCE
5000 BCE	5300–4800 BCE		Yangshao		Hemudu	Daxi		Dapenkeng
			5000–3000 BCE		5000–3400 BCE	5000–3300 BCE		Fuguodun
			ceramics		First lacquerware			5000–3000 BCE
4500 BCE	Zhaobaogou		Painted		Majiabang
	4500–4000 BCE		Rice + millet	Dawenkou	5000–4000 BCE
			Dog + pig	4300–2600 BCE	First jades
4000 BCE					Songze
					4000–3000 BCE
3500 BCE						Qujialing
	Hongshan					3500–2600 BCE	Yingpanshan
	3400–2300 BCE	Majiayao			Liangzhu		~3100 BCE?
3000 BCE	Jades	3300–2700 BCE			3200–1800 BCE			Tanshishan
		Banshan phase	Longshan			Shijiahe	Baodun	Shixia
		2700–2400 BCE	Henan	Longshan		2500–2000 BCE	2800–2000 BCE		Tibetan Plateau
2500 BCE		Machang phase	2800–2000 BCE	Shandong		Longshan			Karuo
		2400–2000 BCE	Shanxi	2600–2000 BCE		Hubei			Baiyangcun
		Qijia	2600–2000 BCE			2400–2000 BCE		Huangguanshan	2200–2100 BCE
2000 BCE	Xiajiadian	2300–1800 BCE						2300–1500 BCE	Dalongtan
	2000–300 BCE	Early bronzes	Erlitou, bronze	Yuezhi					2100–2000 BCE
		Siba	1900–1500 BCE	1900–1500 BCE	Maqiao
1500 BCE		1950–1500 BCE	Erligang period		1800–1200 BCE	Sanxingdui	from ~1500 BCE

== Early Neolithic ==
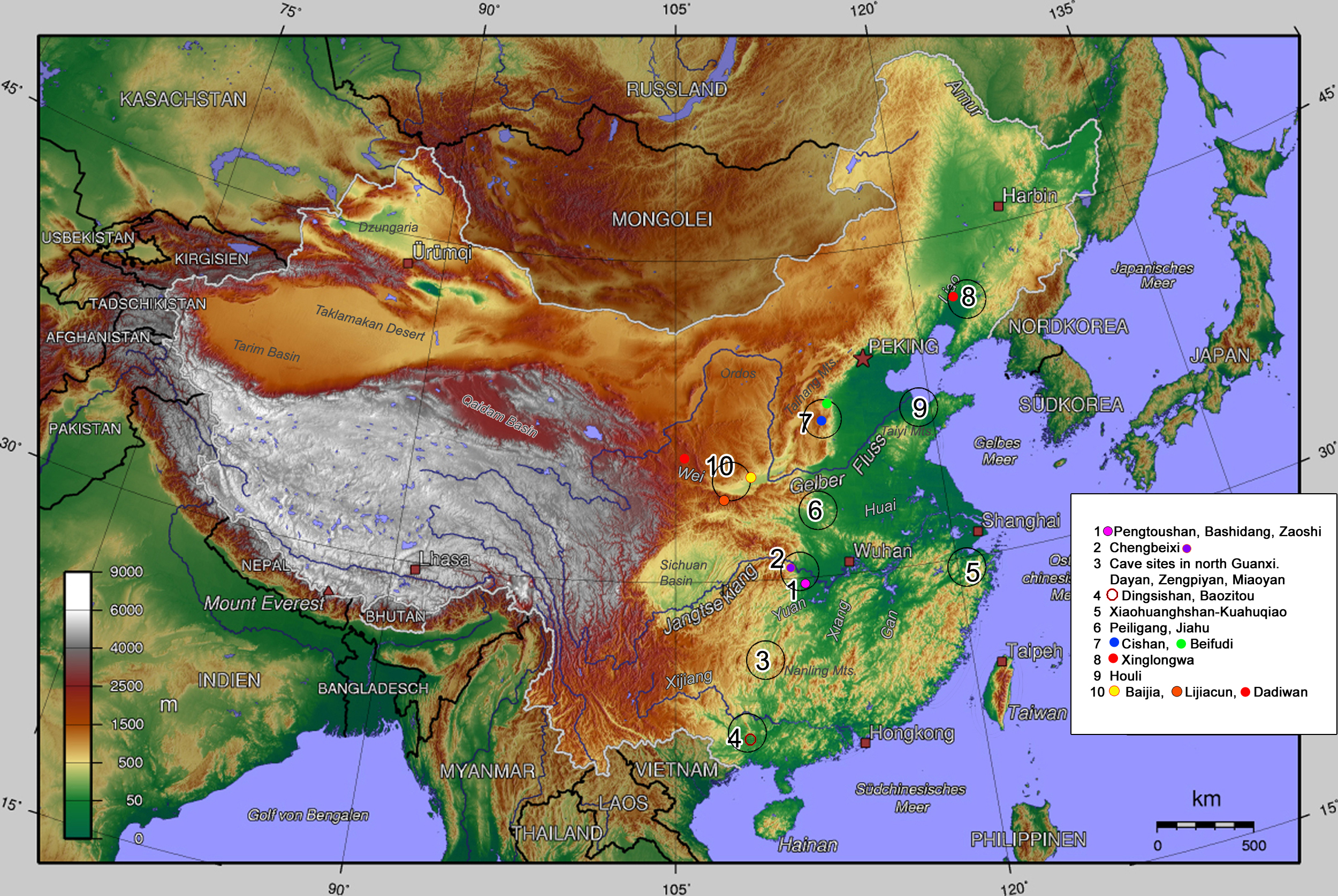
Neolithization and the first Neolithic cultures in China

According to some Chinese prehistorians, this period is considered the "beginning of the Middle Neolithic." For others, this period of neolithization corresponds to the Early Neolithic. The increasingly widespread use of ceramics corresponds with this sedentary lifestyle.

This was a slow process that appeared sporadically across Chinese territory and was remarkably dispersed. Numerous centers of semi-sedentary lifestyle with food supplements provided by significant attempts at cultivation and animal husbandry emerged among groups whose primary subsistence still relied on hunting and gathering around 7000–6000 BCE. Acorns, which require complex preparation due to their toxicity, were often most used, ground on grinding stones, as at Peiligang. Wild fruits and plants were still gathered, along with fish and game products, forming a broad-spectrum subsistence strategy where wild foods remained the most consumed by far during this period. The first fermented beverages appeared in the form of rice beer around the 7th millennium BCE. The domestication of rice occurred over a very long period, and as of 2015, the emergence of domesticated varieties before 4000 BCE remains under debate. The domestication of plants seems to have been preceded by early phases of intensified exploitation, followed by a stage of "pre-domestic agriculture" (still involving mostly wild species), before fully domesticated varieties became widespread. Moreover, over the long period beginning around 17,000 BCE, ceramics diversified. By 7000–6000 BCE, pottery was initially a practical accessory linked to mobility, often showing evident aesthetic and even expressive choices, sometimes related to apparent ritual practices. Flat grinding stones and cylindrical grinders were first used to crush wild plants, particularly acorns and water chestnuts, in an environment rich for populations that were still very sparse for the space they occupied. These were societies with no preserved signs of differentiated hierarchy. However, already in the Xinglongwa culture (c. 6200–5200 BCE), in Inner Mongolia, jade objects (Note: Fang & Hongjuan 2013, p. 38: A jade "dagger" (or possibly a reproduction used as an ornament, since it has a circular hole at one end, nearly along its axis) partly broken and measuring only 3.6 cm, is shown. It is one of the oldest jade artifacts in China. It is kept at the Chinese Academy of Social Sciences, Institute of Archaeological Research (cass.cn).) appear that seem to distinguish certain individuals (as of 2012, one male individual).

=== Yangtze delta region, "Pre-Hemudu": Shangshan, Xiaohuangshan, and Kuahuqiao, 9000–5000 BCE ===
Discoveries dating from 2005–2010 in the same region, south of Shanghai, between Ningbo and Shaoxing, revealed two previously little-known cultures from the very beginning of the Neolithic, predating the Hemudu culture (5000–3300 BCE) [sites of Hemudu, Zishan, Cihu, Tianluoshan, and Fujiashan, near the East China Sea]. The Hemudu culture was the first to demonstrate the ancient mastery of rice cultivation in China. These two new cultures are Shangshan (9000–5000 BCE) [Shangshan and Xiaohuangshan sites] and Kuahuqiao (6000–5000 BCE) [Kuahuqiao and Xiasun sites, 2 km apart]. At these sites, the progressive domestication of rice has been detected, occurring between 10,000/9000 and 5000 BCE.

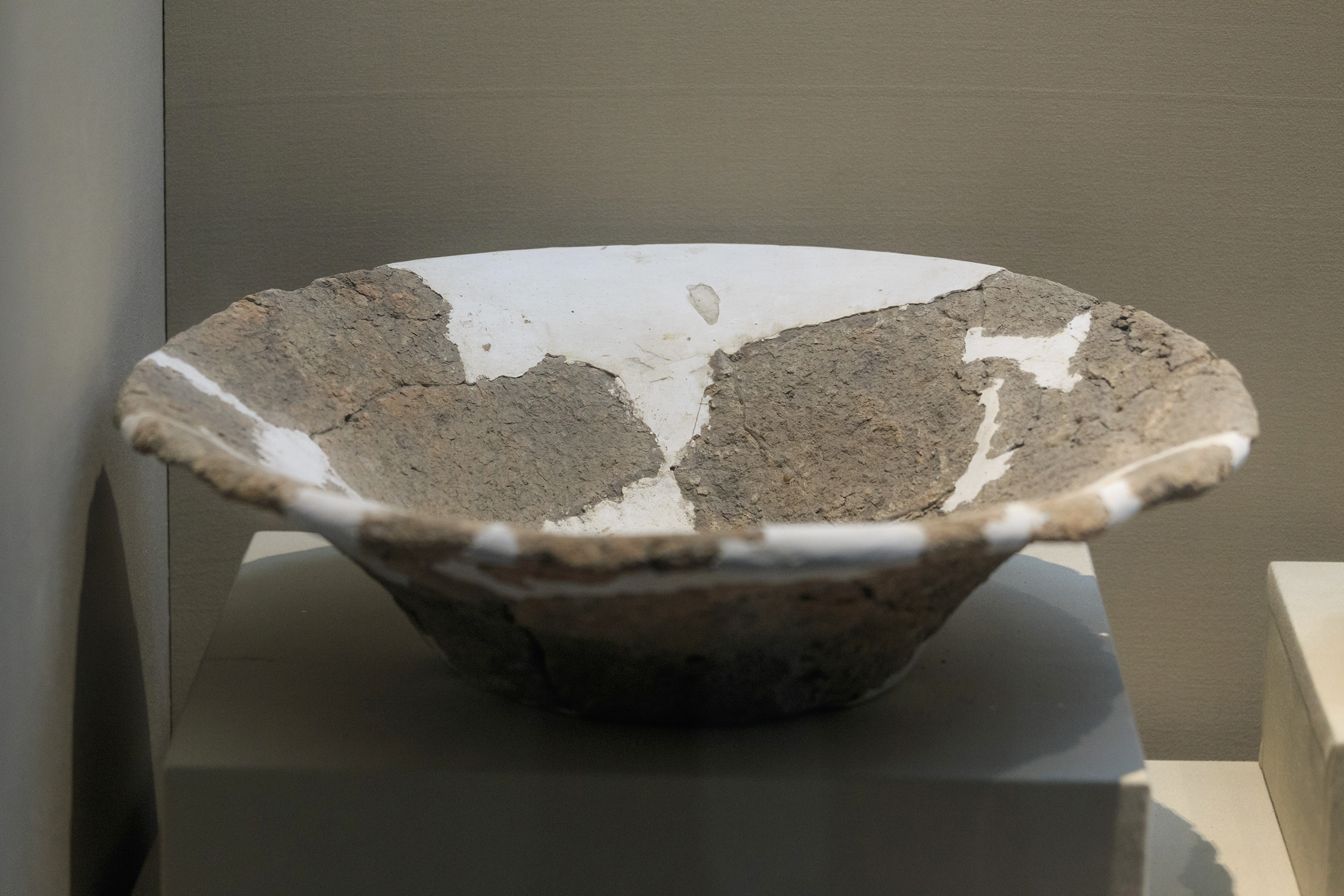
Basin, terracotta. Shangshan site. Zhejiang Museum

The Shangshan culture is (as of 2017) the oldest in the Yangzi region. On the banks of the Puyang River, near Shaoxing and about 200 km from the sea, the Shangshan site (2 hectares, dated to 9000–6000 BCE) shows signs of significant periodic variations following a dry and cold climate (11,000–9,670 BCE), corresponding to the Younger Dryas, followed by a subtropical-humid climate at the beginning of the Holocene. The tools consist of rudimentary implements for scraping and cutting, stone balls (in the form of bolas), perforated pebble discs, stationary grinding slabs, pebble grinders, rare polished bifaces, and adzes. Numerous grinding tools (slabs and grinders/pestles) appear in various forms, indicating a diversified use in the preparation of plant materials, among others. The many storage pits/granaries, as well as the predominance of flat-bottomed pottery, which is unsuitable for mobility, suggest that hunter-gatherers settled there, at least temporarily. Initially, the rice husk and stalk were used as tempering agents in pottery, later replaced by sand. Clues visible to botanists on wild rice samples collected at the Shangshan site suggest that the abundance of wild rice may have inspired inhabitants to attempt its cultivation. The fact that it could be stored to get through the lean season made it, much later, an essential food — and at first, a luxury dish worthy of celebration. It is possible, then, that the oldest alcoholic beverages discovered in China originated from rice fermentation.

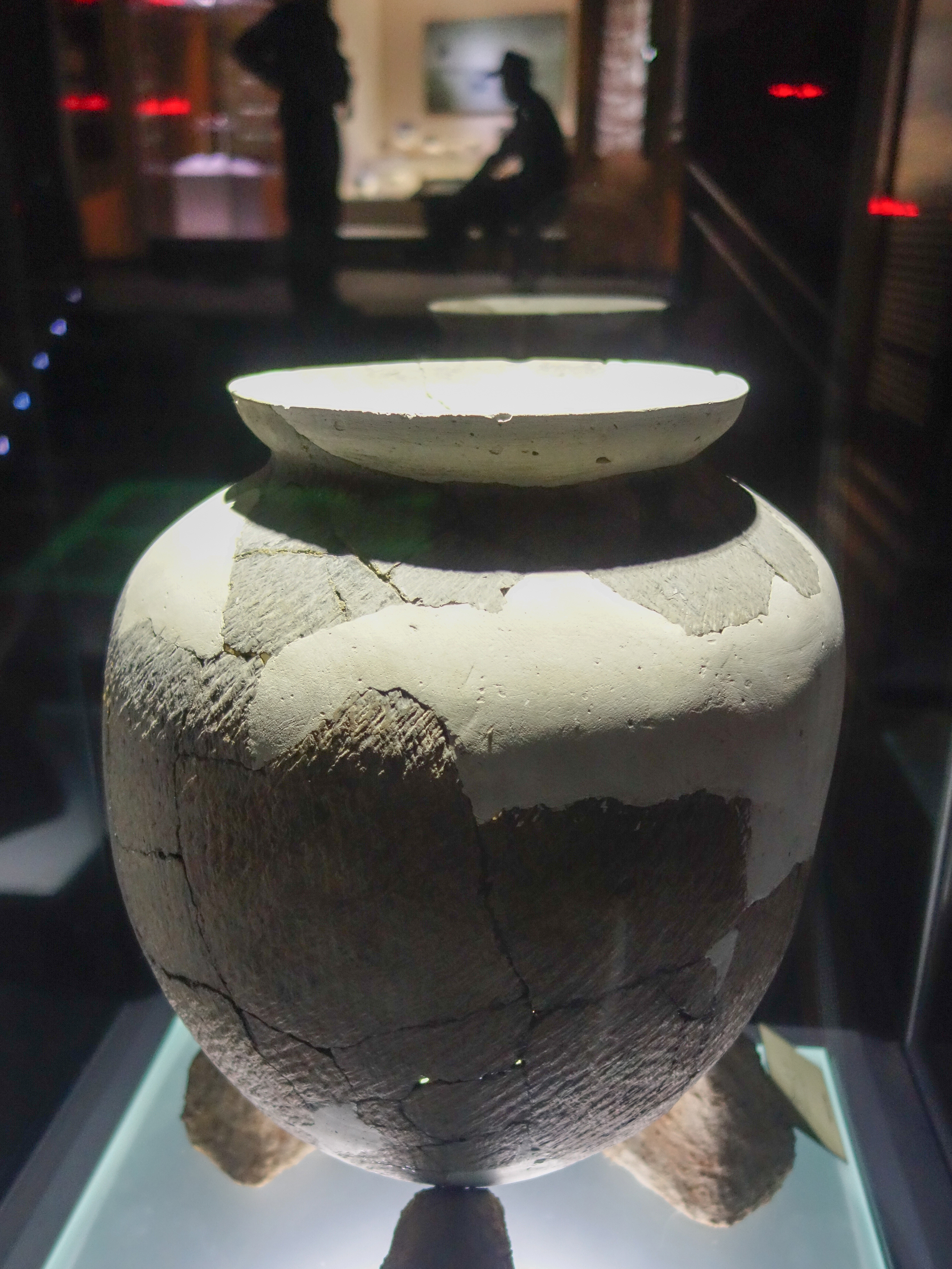
Jar with curved base, decorated by printing (of a rope textile?). 6000-5000 BCE. Kuahuqiao Museum

A successor to the earlier Shangshan culture, the site of Xiaohuangshan, located slightly to the south between Shaoxing and Ningbo, is currently about 100 km from the East China Sea and lies within ancient mountains that have been deeply fragmented into countless valleys. The acidic soil has preserved few organic remains from this culture, in which ceramics diversified, with some resembling those of Kuahuqiao. Numerous underground silos have been found, and the lithic industry mainly features flat grinding stones, some stones used as weights or hammers, bolas (possibly for hunting), and tools intended for woodworking. The ceramics are characterized by large basins, jars with rounded bottoms, and plates. Traces of rice are detectable in the soil. Detailed analysis of residues found on the grinding stones has shown that these populations used a variety of plants: Job's tears, beans, chestnuts, acorns, tubers, as well as rice. However, the rice appears to have only been in the early stages of domestication, cultivated on dry land. The warm and humid climate, also favorable to other plants, may have slowed down its early domestication.

The site of Kuahuqiao (6000–5000 BCE), located very close to the Qiantang River and slightly to the north between Shaoxing and Ningbo, is also a valuable testament to this period. At the time, the region consisted of mountains and well-watered lowland areas. Thanks to waterlogged preservation conditions, the site has yielded numerous organic remains. The stilted dwellings had earthen walls, and the mortise-and-tenon joint technique was practiced. A wide variety of tools have been discovered there: made of stone, wood, bamboo, bone, and deer antler. The lithic material, primarily composed of polished stone, includes adzes, axes, chisels, arrowheads, hammers, grindstones, and pestles. Spindle whorls were made from terracotta. The pottery (fired at 750–850 °C) is notable for its use of cauldrons (of the fu type), pots, plates, stands (dou type), and other forms that Chinese archaeologists tend to associate with much later shapes, naming them after the corresponding later types. (Note: Debaine-Francfort 1995, p. 29, pointed out in 1995 the "problems of descriptive terminology and quantification" used by Chinese archaeologists when identifying ancient ceramics. She especially noted that "the terms used to define functional types of vessels [...] sometimes cover very different forms." For instance, the term guan can refer to a large jar, a small pot, or even a cup. This practice was still in use without being questioned as of 2013, as seen systematically in Zhiyan, Bower & Li 2010 and Underhill 2013.) This pottery is of unmatched quality compared to what was produced elsewhere at the same time. The jars can reach sizes up to 36 cm in diameter and 40 cm in height, with one exceptional plate measuring 110 cm in diameter and 43 cm in height. Decorative elements include cord-marking, impressions, incisions, perforations, slip painting (possibly black polished), and motifs (on about 5% of pieces). In addition, a 5.60 m canoe dating back to 6000 BCE was discovered at the site. The craftsmanship involved in making this canoe—apparently built or repaired on-site—was noted for its quality. As of 2012 and 2017, it remains the oldest known example of nautical technology in China.

Kuahuqiao: the botanical remains primarily come from wild species; the thousands of rice grains discovered belong to both wild and cultivated rice (40%) in the process of domestication. Rice was only a supplementary food source, in an as yet undetermined proportion. 98% of the rice discovered corresponds to the period from 6200 to 5300 BCE but appears to have almost disappeared afterward, seemingly due to flooding, until the site was abandoned around 5000 BCE. Many nutritional resources have been analyzed, with acorns being the dominant food source following a period when aquatic plants were heavily consumed (foxnut/Euryale ferox, water caltrop) or used (Cyperaceae/carex or sedge). One-third of the underground silos—wooden structures with sandy bottoms—contained stores of acorns. However, ventilation control was necessary, and these acorns likely had to be dried or roasted. Since ten layers of charcoal are found across the period, it is possible that slash-and-burn practices were used to clear oak environments for better acorn harvests (a resource that varies from year to year). Furthermore, the domestication of the peach tree seems to have begun (between 6000 and 2300 BCE) in the region that includes Kuahuqiao, where it is the most common fruit tree. Over time, the consumption of hygrophilous plants decreased while the consumption of forest-edge fruit trees increased. Deer (and also wild buffalo) were increasingly hunted—possibly due to slash-and-burn practices. Over a thousand years, the wolf, having been domesticated, became the dog. The pig was also domesticated, but hunting, fishing, and shellfish gathering surpassed the consumption of domesticated animals. The inhabitants of Kuahuqiao likely enjoyed a varied diet, adapting to seasonal changes and fluctuations in abundance, with a very wide range of both plant and animal species being consumed.

=== Southwest, Middle Yangzi: c. 7000–5500 BCE: "Pre-Daxi" ===
The cultures of the Southwest and Middle Yangzi: (Note: The regions referred to as Southwest China are cited from Liu & Chen 2012, p. 25, and include major cities such as Chengdu and Kunming.) in this region, which covers the northern part of the subtropical zone, both fauna and flora were rich at the time. In this environment, a few early Neolithic sites developed in very diverse landscapes, ranging from alluvial plains to the foothills of mountains. Some groups practiced modest rice cultivation (which still likely remained in a more or less wild form), while others continued hunter-gatherer strategies for millennia. Under the name "Pengtoushan culture," archaeologists associate several sites in this region throughout two millennia:

- 7000–5800 BCE, Pengtoushan–Bashidang Culture, northwest of Lake Dongting, followed by the Lower Zaoshi Culture, c. 5800–5500 BCE.
- 6500–5000 BCE, Chengbeixi Culture, further north in this region: small sites located in the Xiajiang area, west of Hubei.

=== The West ===
Research conducted in 2013 on the earliest dated site (5600–5000 BCE), Yangchang, located on the edge of the Tarim Basin at the foot of the Kunlun Mountains in Xinjiang, on the ancient banks of the Keriya River, showed that this region was inhabited by hunter-gatherers during the wet climatic optimum of the Holocene. Around a hearth located near the old riverbank, blades, scrapers, and quartzite flakes were found. This human presence along the river may, according to archaeologists, be an indication of a migration route (along with other rivers in the basin before their partial drying up) toward the Tibetan Plateau, since the same type of unusually large blade (up to 54 mm) has been found on contemporary sites.

A 2007 paleoenvironmental study on the northern edges of the Tibetan Plateau proposed several scenarios for the Neolithization of the plateau. There is evidence of the appearance of early farmers and herders, but no sites have yet been discovered. Climate fluctuations likely led some hunter-gatherer populations on the Tibetan Plateau to experiment with various crops, and when these experiments failed, they may have turned back to hunting and gathering, which remained dominant strategies. Immediately after the Younger Dryas, wild millet—but especially a specific variety of Tibetan barley—appears to have been consumed. Its domestication likely occurred afterward, independently from other regions. From then on and into the present day, the region has experienced alternating periods of wetter and drier climates. The Bactrian camel, traces of which date back to around 4000 BCE during the Final Neolithic, was likely still wild at that time. Its systematic use in these fragile zones, beginning with the Zhou Dynasty, may have contributed to vegetation degradation and the transformation of stable dunes into shifting sands.

=== North, Middle Yellow River: "Pre-Yangshao," c. 7000–5000 BCE ===
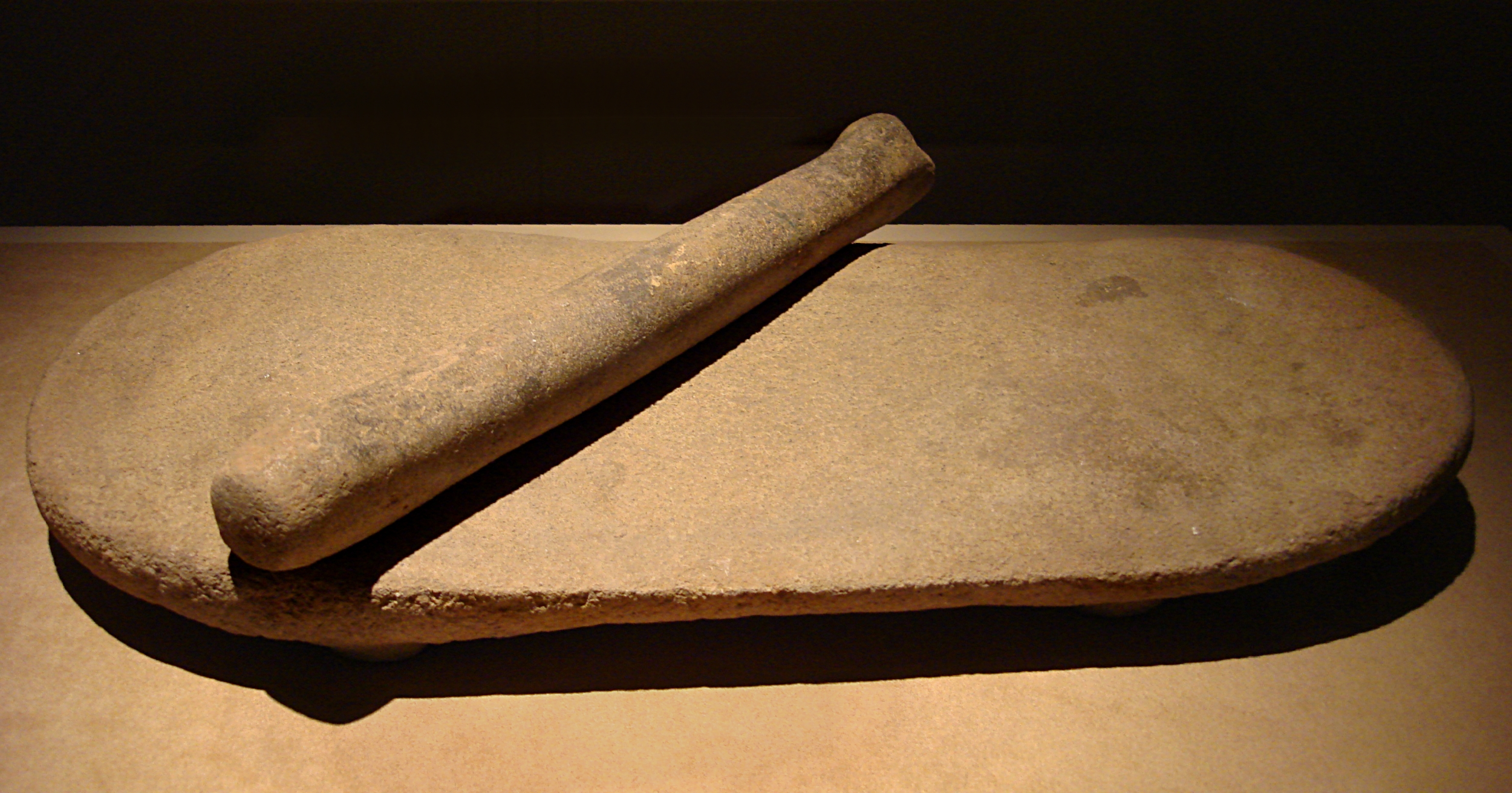
Four-legged millstone and its grinding wheel. Yellow sandstone. (Note: See also: Archambault de Beaune, Sophie (2000). Pour une archéologie du geste : broyer, moudre, piler: des premiers chasseurs aux premiers agriculteurs [For an archaeology of the gesture: crushing, grinding, pounding: from the first hunters to the first farmers] (in French). CNRS éditions. ISBN 2-271-05810-4., especially page 92 onward. A similar object is described in Notice 19 of Werning & Debaine-Francfort 1991, pp. 90–93. This type of grinding tool could be used for both cultivated and wild grains.) Peiligang culture, Xinzheng, Henan. National Museum of China, Beijing

The "Pre-Yangshao" sites include, among others, the Laoguantai culture (including Baijia–Dadiwan I), dated to around 6000–5000 BCE, and the Peiligang–Cishan culture: Peiligang, c. 7000–5000 BCE, and Cishan–Beifudi, c. 6500–5000 BCE.

Some sites from the Peiligang culture show early evidence of millet (foxtail millet) cultivation. This area is currently considered the location of the first domestication of millet, alongside the Cishan culture. Beyond having pottery much more durable than in previous periods, the Peiligang culture also produced, at Jiahu, containers intended to hold fermented beverages made from rice, (Note: The nature of the rice gathered, whether wild or domesticated, at the Bashidang site was still a matter of debate in 2015. (Shelach-Lavi 2015, p. 117)) honey, hawthorn berries, or grapes. This could represent the earliest known use of grapes in an alcoholic beverage. The Jiahu site included 45 houses, numerous storage pits, a few kilns, and cemeteries. Archaeologists suggest that the Peiligang communities were relatively egalitarian, with a rudimentary political organization, as there are few differences in burial offerings. However, grinding stones were systematically found in women's graves, suggesting gendered roles in food preparation.

=== North, region near the mouth of the Yellow River: Houli culture, c. 6500–5500 BCE ===
Primarily located in Shandong, this culture still raises questions: further research is needed to determine whether sedentary life was the dominant lifestyle or whether it was more or less intermittent, interrupted by a nomadic lifestyle of hunter-gatherers. Millet cultivation has been confirmed at one site: foxtail millet and common millet, as well as possible traces of rice. (Note: A wild rice, apparently: a 2006 study (Crawford et al. in the Chinese journal Dongfang Kaogu (Vol. 3), p. 247–251) has been interpreted differently: according to Liu & Chen 2012, p. 140, no difference could be detected between it and domesticated rice.) Numerous stone objects, both chipped and polished, have been found, along with very limited ceramic types, characterized by simple utilitarian forms.

=== Northeast: Xinglongwa, c. 6200–5200 BCE ===
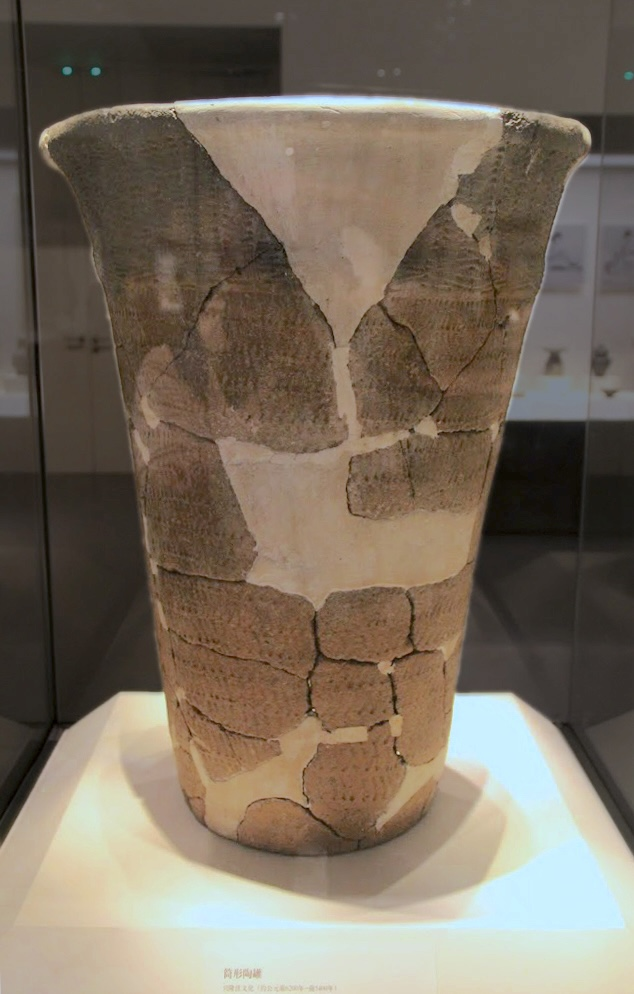
Terracotta jar with corded decoration. Liaoning. National Museum of China, Beijing

From approximately 6200 to 5200 BCE, this is the earliest identified Neolithic culture in northeastern China. It is mainly located at the present-day borders of Inner Mongolia and Liaoning provinces. The dwellings often appear in village layouts organized in a grid pattern with parallel rows. Each house had a central hearth. The Xinglongwa site itself had two large central buildings (around 140 m²). Some structures appear to have had ritual purposes: many animal skeletons — mostly pigs and deer, some pierced and arranged in clusters on the ground — were discovered. In the richest tomb, a man was buried with two pigs and numerous ceramic, stone, bone, shell, and jade objects — a very rare practice in this region. The ceramics are of simple shape, with the bucket being the most common form. They were made of sandy, brownish clay, shaped using the coiling method, sometimes with cord-marked decoration.

=== South: Pearl River, Southern Guangxi — Dingsishan and Baozitou Cultures, c. 6000–5000 BCE ===
The Dingsishan and Baozitou cultures (also spelled Baozhitou)—named after a site in the Yongning district (Guangxi)—are located on the first terraces of the Zuo, You, and Yong Rivers, and belong to what is referred to as the Pearl River cultural complex. The Baozitou site is located in the Nanning prefecture. (Note: Nanning is a prefecture in the Zhuang Autonomous Region of Guangxi.) This culture is interpreted as a phase of neolithization due to its pottery production: round-bottomed guan-type jars with a nearly straight or slightly raised opening, without a rim. The tools are often simple-shaped shells. (Note: Here is a way to quickly access the descriptive vocabulary of prehistoric ceramics, using as an example the Cauliez, Jessie; Delaunay, Gaëlle; Duplan, Véronique (2002). "Nomenclature et description des formes pour l'étude des céramiques de la fin du néolithique en Provence" [Classification and description of shapes for the study of ceramics from the end of the Neolithic period in Provence]. Préhistoires méditerranéennes (in French) (10–11): 61–82. doi:10.4000/pm.250.) The main tool assemblage includes chipped stones, worked pebbles, and pierced stones with large holes (10 cm long × 7 cm wide × 4 cm thick), along with axes and adzes made of polished stone. This culture corresponds to a period of particularly hot and humid climate (c. 8400–4000 BCE), favorable to the development of tropical forest. Animals consumed include bovines, deer, and pigs, but overall this is a hunter-gatherer culture focused on shellfish and edible plants. The dead were buried in a flexed or crouched position, or dismembered. The sites are associated either with large shell middens or limestone caves in the Guangxi and Guangdong provinces. Around forty sites correspond to developed caves, which were continuously used from the end of the Paleolithic to the Neolithic.

=== Southeast: The Coast ===
The origin of Austronesian populations, long assumed to be in southeastern continental Asia, is now confirmed. The Pearl River Delta is considered a second possible point of origin. Later, Taiwan became the departure point for these languages spreading toward Indonesia and the Pacific. Their movement from the continent to the island likely occurred via the coast facing Taiwan, where several sites show material culture similar to that found on the other side of the Taiwan Strait, in the Dapenkeng culture. The Neolithic sites of the southeast coast, such as Keqiutou, Fuguodun, and Jinguishan, emerged with a wide variety of pottery, polished stone tools, and bone tools around 6000 BCE, and disappeared with the appearance of bronze around 3500 BCE. The Dapenkeng culture, dating from 4500 to 2200 BCE, represents the initial Neolithic phase on the island of Taiwan. The inhabitants practiced horticulture and hunting, but also gathered marine shellfish and fished, before later supplementing their diet with rice and millet cultivation. As of 2016, there appears to be a consensus on this matter: Austronesian populations originated from the mainland and migrated to the island via these coastal sites.

== Middle Neolithic ==
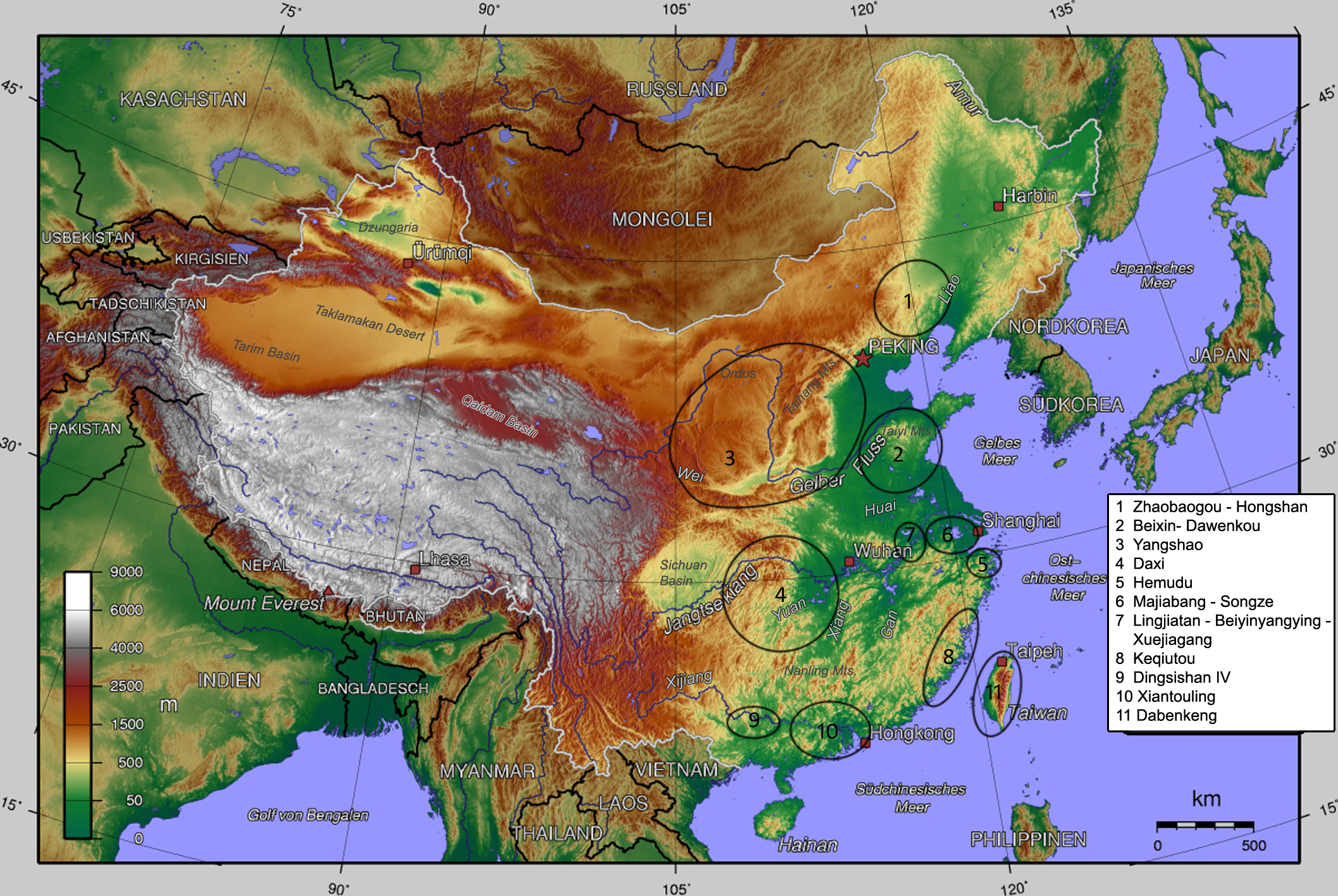
Middle Neolithic cultures in China

Several sites, where highly differentiated cultures show early signs of Neolithization, partly or mostly transitioned to food production and storage, with domesticated millet and rice becoming highly valued staples. After a phase during which some populations experienced nutritional deficiencies, there was a significant demographic expansion. This transition took place both on the mainland and on the islands, particularly with the Dapenkeng culture in Taiwan.

The use of polished stone, especially jade, which is very hard to work with, appeared in the Hongshan culture in the Northeast. As these populations came into contact with others across regions, the use of such prestige objects became an indication of societies with labor division and the emergence of elites. These elites distinguished themselves through ostentatious markers that have been preserved: luxury funerary ceramics in some areas, piles of precious jade in others. Polished stone thus signaled social differentiation; it was used both to create everyday tools and weapons for hunting and warfare, signs of which became increasingly common in certain regions around 3500–3000 BCE.

All of the archaeological discoveries made since 1921, gradually grouped under the name "Yangshao culture" (named after the first discovery site), have proved to be highly diverse as research progressed. These cultures extended over a wide area, mainly around the middle reaches of the Yellow River, and over a very long period. After the cultures from around 5500–5000 BCE, known as "pre-Yangshao", which reflect the first centers of Neolithization in China, current knowledge about this cultural complex reveals four major Neolithic periods.

In the early and middle phases, these were egalitarian societies. Their production of painted funerary ceramics demonstrates a remarkable wealth of invention. These ceramics were well-fired, at around 900 °C. Shaped using the coiling method, they were later finished on a slow-turning wheel for smaller pieces toward the end of the period. Agriculture became a major source of food, leading to a significant population increase, and larger villages than before began to multiply—spreading from the foothills to the plains, and from east to west, due to demographic pressure. During the Middle Yangshao period, these lineage-based societies still appeared to be egalitarian, although adult and elderly women were excluded from collective burials, possibly because they came from other communities through marriage alliances. In the late phase, some anthropologists believe that these societies began to evolve into chiefdoms. (Note: This term, borrowed from ethnological vocabulary, implicitly suggests the emergence of unequal societies. (Ref: Demoule, Jean-Paul (2007). La Révolution néolithique en France [The Neolithic Revolution in France] (in French). p. 22.). The processes involved have been studied in the framework of social identity theory, particularly regarding comparison mechanisms in identity formation, which lead to competition between individuals and then between groups. However, the expression "chiefdom society", used by American neo-evolutionists (such as Lewis Henry Morgan and Leslie White), has been criticized by Alain Testart. This anthropologist argued that hierarchical societies could have existed much earlier, among hunter-gatherers, as was the case with the Northwest Coast Amerindians in the modern era (Avant l'histoire [Before history] (in French). Gallimard. 2012. pp. 201–202. ISBN 978-2-07-013184-6.. General critique of neo-evolutionist concepts: p. 54 ff.).)

=== East-Central China, Yangtze River Delta region: Hemudu Culture, c. 5000–3300 BCE ===
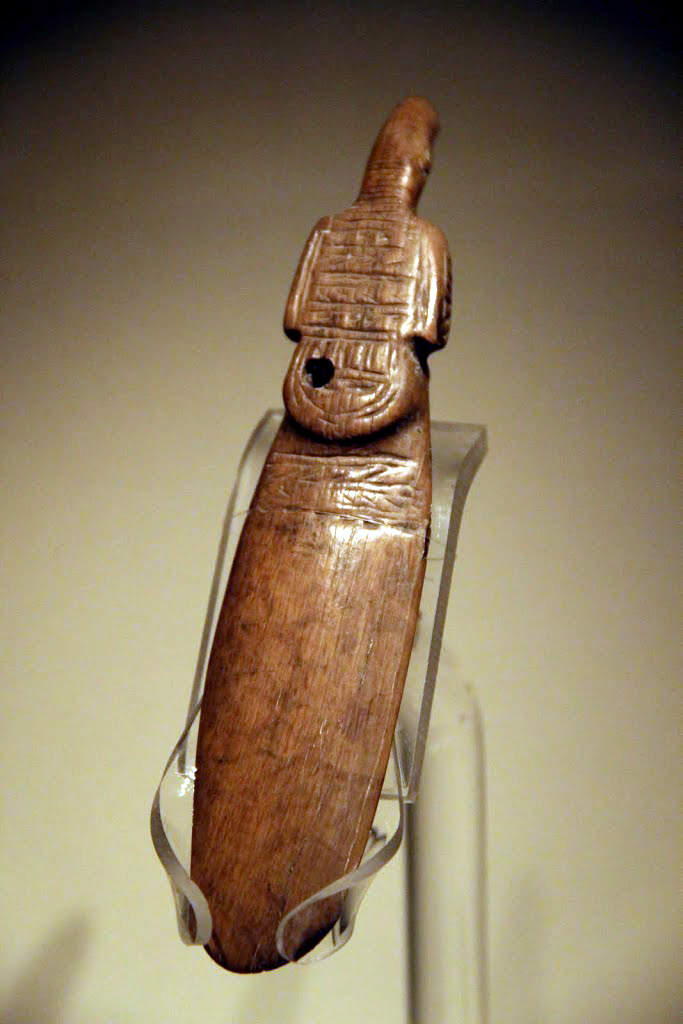
Ivory shaped like a paddle and decorated with various elements including a bird's head. (Note: The tip of the object is what allows it to be seen as a "bird hybrid". This evokes the tradition of the phoenix in later Chinese culture.) National Museum of China

The Hemudu culture spans the entire period from initial neolithization to the Neolithic, encompassing several slightly differentiated cultures over a very long timespan: the Hemudu culture (c. 5000–3300 BCE), Majiabang (c. 5000–4000 BCE), Songze (c. 4000–3300 BCE), Beiyinyangying (c. 4000–3300 BCE), and Xuejiagang (c. 3300 BCE).

The Hemudu culture is located in a relatively small area, well south of Shanghai, and to the south of Hangzhou Bay. The stilted lake dwellings discovered in 1973 were a major surprise, due to their extreme contrast with the earthen dwellings of northern China, which had appeared to be the origin and center of Chinese culture in the Central Plain. In a region of hills and well-watered plains, many neighboring cultures thrived under a much warmer and more humid climate than today. The early Hemudu culture was itself preceded by associated cultures such as Xiaohuangshan (c. 7000–6000 BCE) and Kuahuqiao (c. 6000–5000 BCE). Initially wild rice cultivation was practiced over a long period until its domestication. Early forms of rice farming used drainage methods, followed later by irrigated fields in Zhejiang around 4000 BCE, notably at the Kuahuqiao site (6000–5500 BCE) in the delta, where irrigation canals and wells have been found, and at Tianluoshan (5000–3000 BCE), where rice was cultivated and in the process of being domesticated. (Note: "Rice fields and modes of rice cultivation between 5000 and 2500 BC in east China". researchgate.net. 2009. Archived from the original on February 15, 2019.: "... rice was cultivated and was undergoing the domestication process.") However, the inhabitants of Hemudu largely relied on natural resources, which were abundant in their environment, for food. As early as Period I, various body ornaments in fluorite and "pseudo-jade" appeared, followed later by developed jade craftsmanship. The ceramics were often black, with uneven wall thickness; during Period I, firing temperatures barely exceeded 800 °C. The stilt houses often demonstrate expertise in mortise-and-tenon joint construction. The oldest known lacquered object in the world, a wooden bowl, was discovered there. During the final period, ceramics were usually fired at relatively high temperatures, were thin and sturdy, and shaped using a slow-turning wheel, and at times a fast wheel.

=== Southwest, Middle Yangtze: Daxi culture, c. 5000–3300 BCE ===
The Daxi culture is located in the Three Gorges region, along the middle course of the Yangtze River. The Chengtoushan site, surrounded by a drainage ditch from its founding around 4500 BCE, was quickly protected by a wall and a deep moat. By around 4000 BCE, it covered an area of 8 hectares. From the earliest period of occupation, the site features the first rice paddies discovered in China, alongside traditional food sources used by hunter-gatherers. Pigs were fully domesticated. The population grew considerably in this context of a rich and varied diet combined with a sedentary lifestyle. This culture may have been the origin of the Qujialing (c. 3400–2500 BCE) and Shijiahe cultures (c. 2500–2000 BCE). However, in its final phase, it shows similarities with the Longshan culture (3000–2100 BCE). Large ditches appear to have been used for drainage during the rainy season. Burial deposits already indicate significant social differentiation.

=== North, Middle Yellow River: Yangshao culture, c. 5000–3000 BCE ===
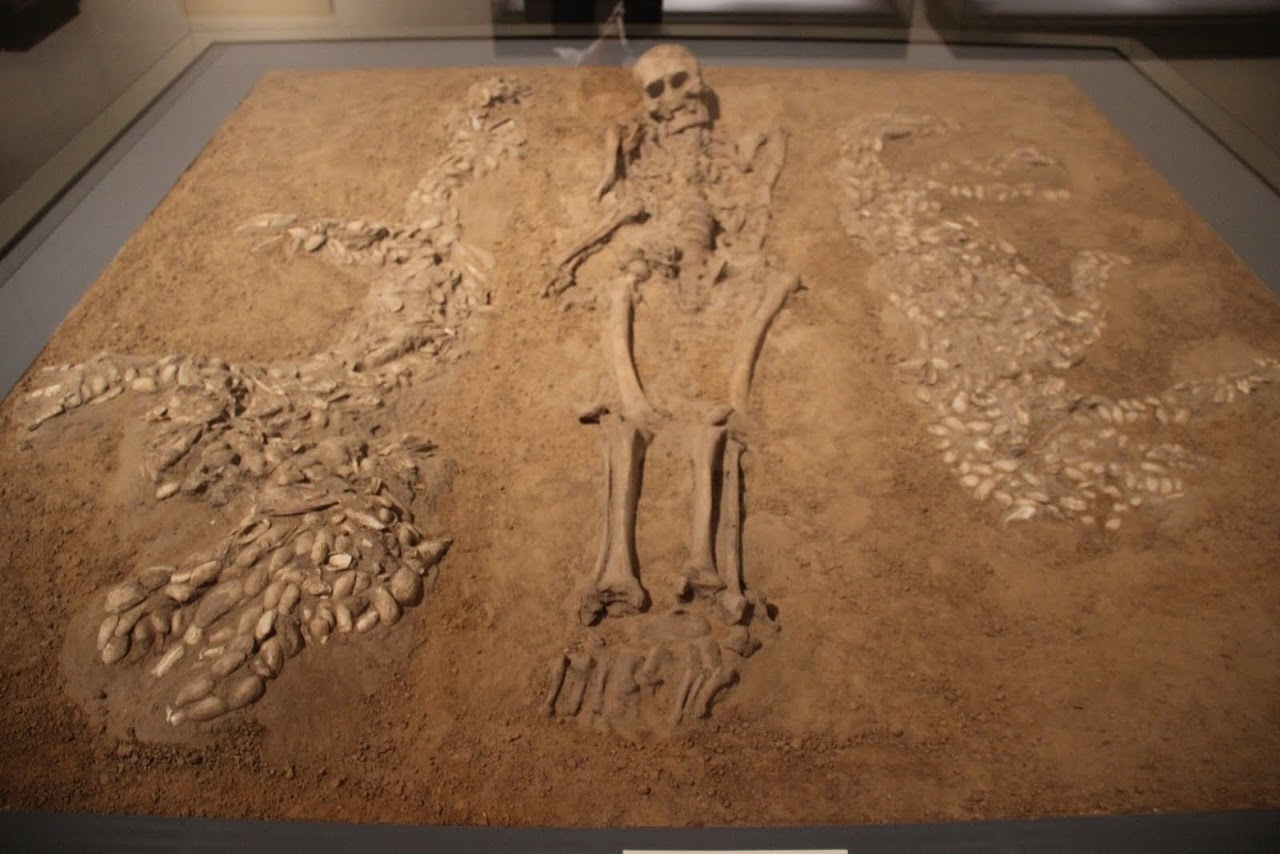
Tomb with shell mosaics and a human skeleton interpreted as a shaman. Yangshao. National Museum of China

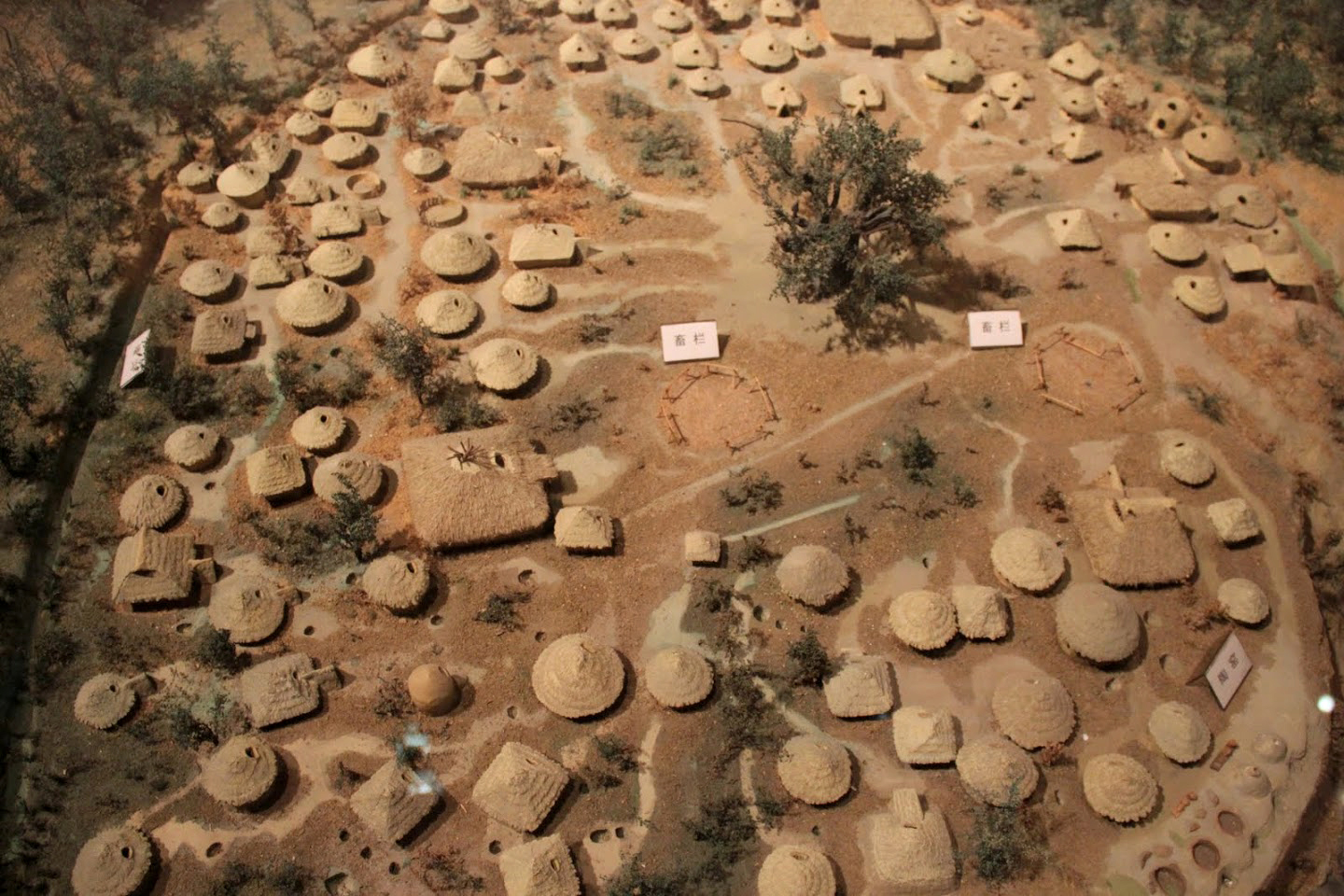
Hypothetical reconstruction of the village of Jiangzhai, Banpo region, in the era of ancient Yangshao. National Museum of China

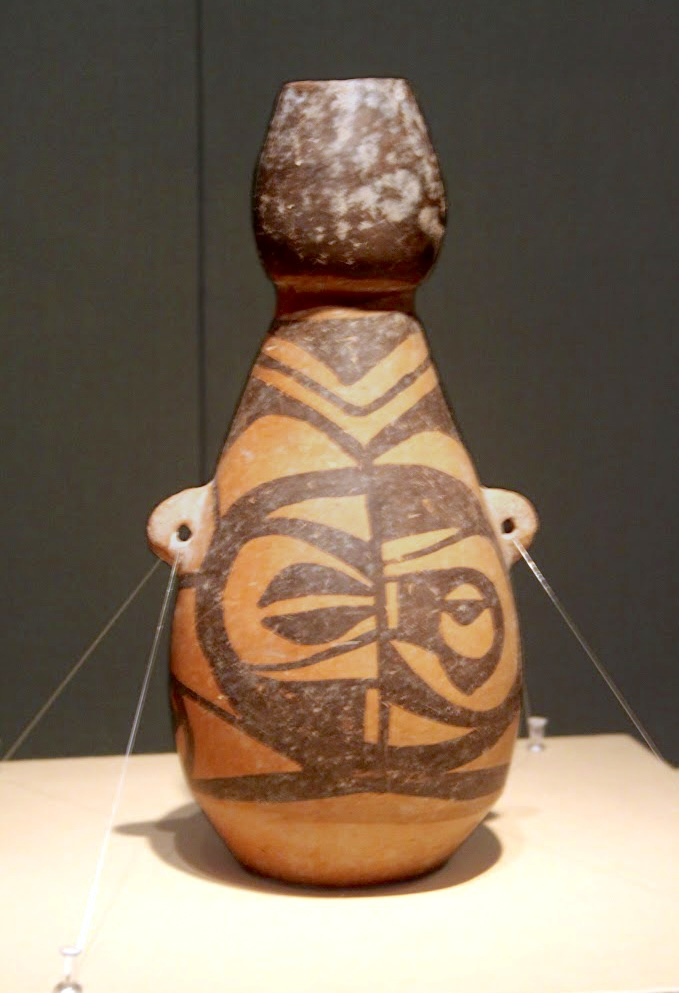
Jar decorated with a mask (?). Small terracotta jar. Ancient Yangshao. Shaanxi History Museum, Xi'an.

Discovered in 1921, Yangshao, in the Henan province, was the first Chinese Neolithic site to be studied. In the following decades, many sites along the middle Yellow River and the Wei River were attributed to the Yangshao culture. The most famous, Banpo, near Xi'an, has become a tourist attraction. The Yangshao period corresponds to the post-glacial climatic optimum in northern China. The geographic extent and sophistication of this culture led, for some time, to the strengthening of the idea that the Yellow River Valley was the original core from which Chinese culture spread.

During the initial phase, Early Yangshao (5000–4000 BCE), the cultivation of foxtail millet and broomcorn millet became important food sources and resulted in significant population growth and increased village size, although hunting still played a major role. Settlements were dispersed, with sites averaging about 5 or 6 hectares. During the following period, Middle Yangshao (4000–3500 BCE), also known as the Miaodigou phase, some sites expanded to 40 to 90 hectares.

During the final phase (Late Yangshao, 3500–3000 BCE), two types of cultures can be distinguished. Some, such as Dadiwan, served as regional centers, with this site reaching a size of 50 hectares. Others were conflict-ridden settlements, of medium size, such as in the Zhengzhou region—the Xishan site, for example, covered 25 hectares. Some graves stand out due to exceptional burial offerings. These required significant investment and may indicate the first signs of social differentiation, whereas Early Yangshao society was thought to have been egalitarian. One tomb appears to have revealed evidence of shamanism, but the interpretation of the archaeological find remains problematic: Chinese researchers believed they recognized a dragon and a tiger on either side of the deceased, formed in a mosaic of mollusk shells—a truly unique decoration. Whether shamanism, a phenomenon observed in modern times, can be proven through archaeological remains, was still a topic of debate in 1998.

=== Northeast, area extending toward the Yellow River delta: Beixin culture (ca. 5300–4300 BCE) – Dawenkou culture (ca. 4300–2400 BCE) ===
The Beixin culture (ca. 5300–4300 BCE) in Shandong, located in the warm and humid climate of the floodplains near the Yellow River delta, left behind traces of settlements. These were sedentary populations living in small dwellings (less than 10 m², semi-subterranean, round or oval-shaped (Note: The small dwellings of hunter-gatherer populations in the process of partial Neolithization remind us that most of daily life took place outdoors. Dwellings several times larger than those found at Beixin were used in the earlier Houli culture: (WANG Fen in Underhill 2013, p. 404).)). Access was provided via a gentle slope or a few steps. Within the village, ash pits, cemeteries, and ceramic kilns have been found. The pottery, still handmade, had compositions adapted to its intended function. Depending on the tool's purpose, stone could be either knapped and then polished, or simply knapped. The populations relied on a wide range of subsistence methods: hunting and fishing, seasonal gathering, cultivation, and domesticated animals. The abundance of natural resources, especially near water sources, gave fishing and mussel gathering particular importance.

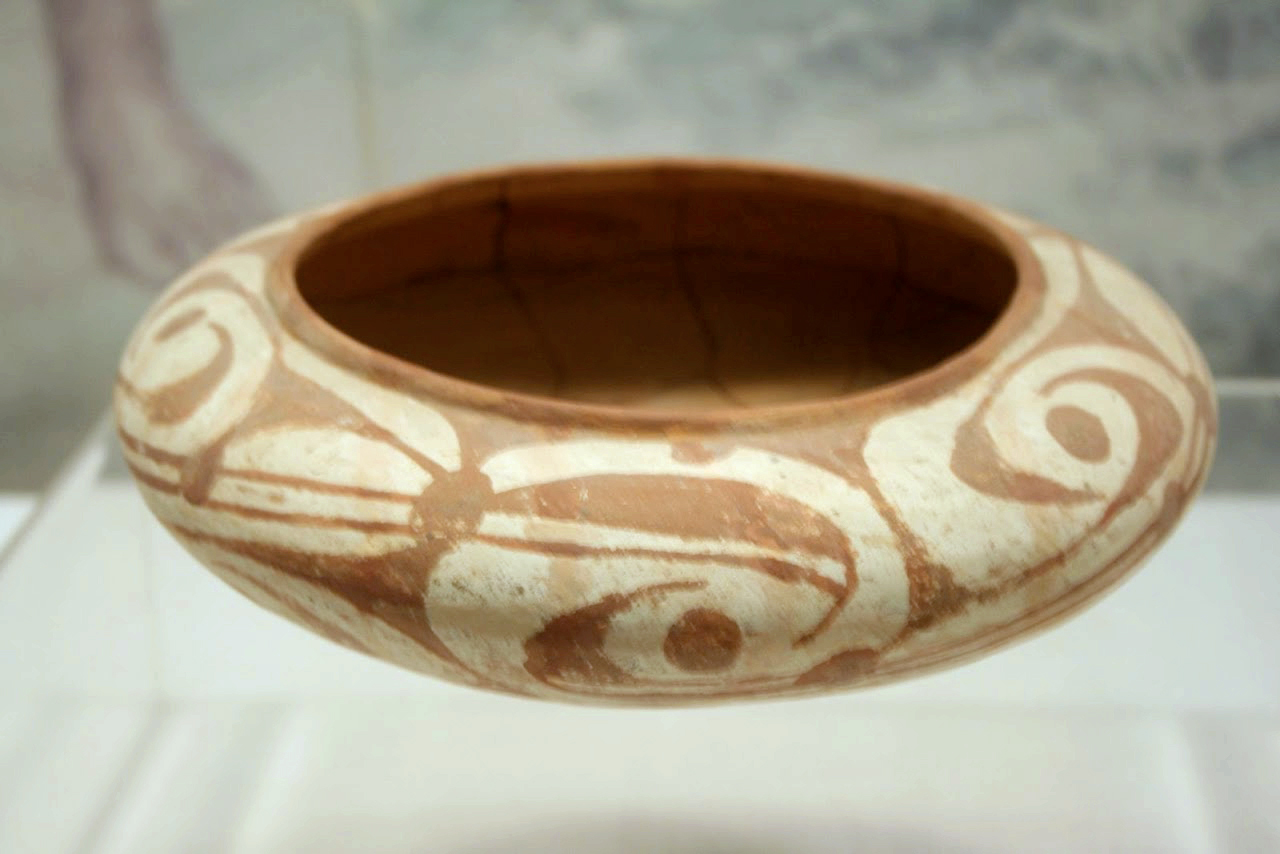
Bol, Dawenkou. Painted terracotta. Jiangsu Museum, Nanjing

The Dawenkou culture (ca. 4300–2600 BCE) saw the transition from hand-built pottery to wheel-thrown ceramics using large stone wheels. Elegant forms emerged, sometimes perforated so they could be placed over a hearth. Abstract painted decorations or stylized motifs were arranged with remarkable skill across the entire surface. These objects, found in burials, reflect a culture that also mastered agriculture, as suggested by the presence of knives and sickles, likely used for harvesting. Excavations have uncovered numerous traces of millet, rice, and soybean seeds in various archaeological layers. The main domesticated animals were pigs and dogs, with pig mandibles likely serving as funerary offerings. Jade ornaments and tripod vessels—which would later inspire the shape of the bronze li vessels—became more widespread and indicated social differentiation. In the final phase, decorative motifs disappeared in favor of a greater focus on technical refinement, especially in the form of tall, slender goblets with perfectly vertical stems. This development appears to have continued into the Longshan culture.

=== Northeast: Hongshan culture, ca. 4700–2900 BCE up to the final Neolithic ===
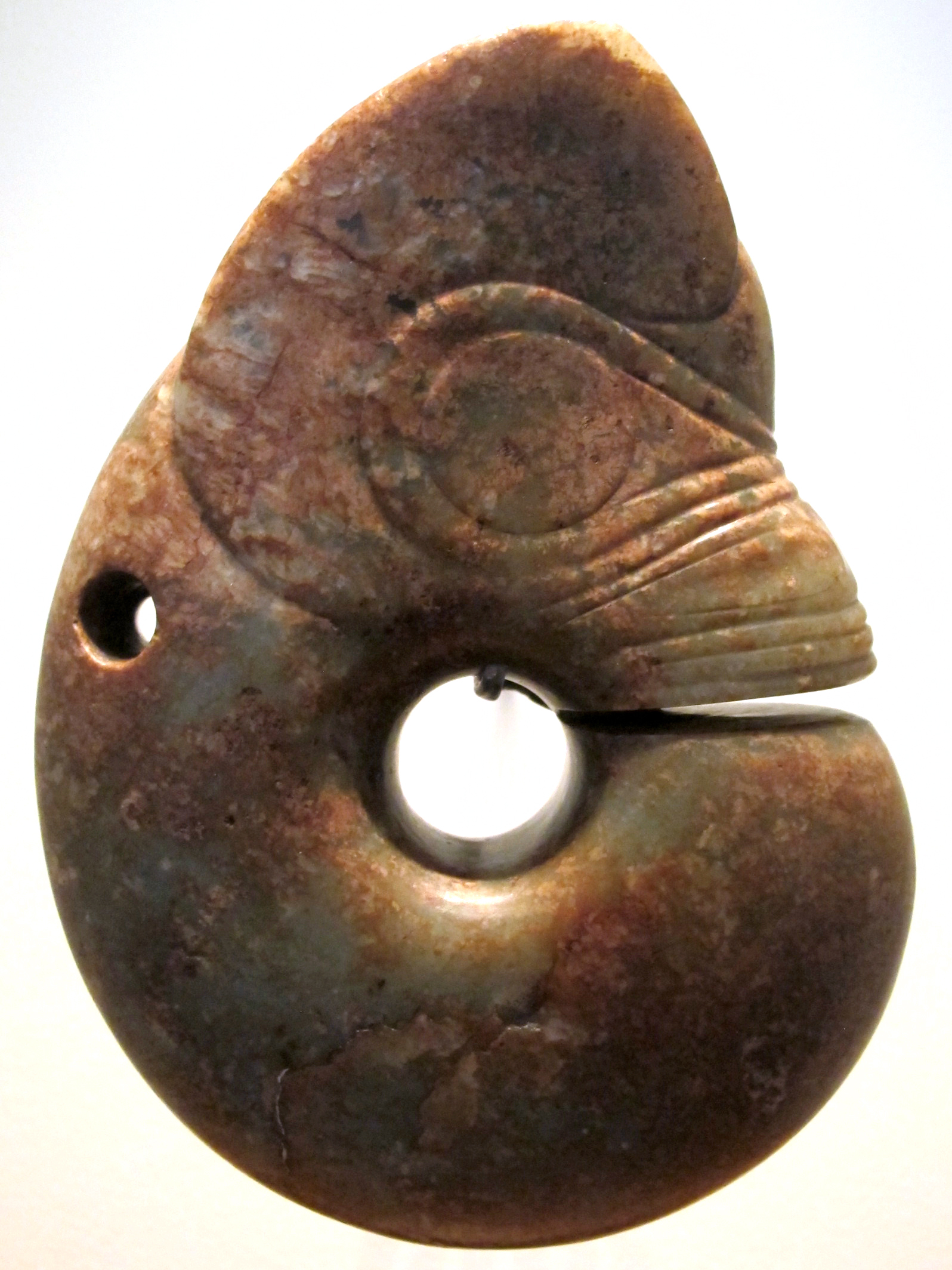
Amulet: dragon (Pig dragon) or coiled insect larva. Liaoning. Jade H. 15 cm. Guimet Museum.

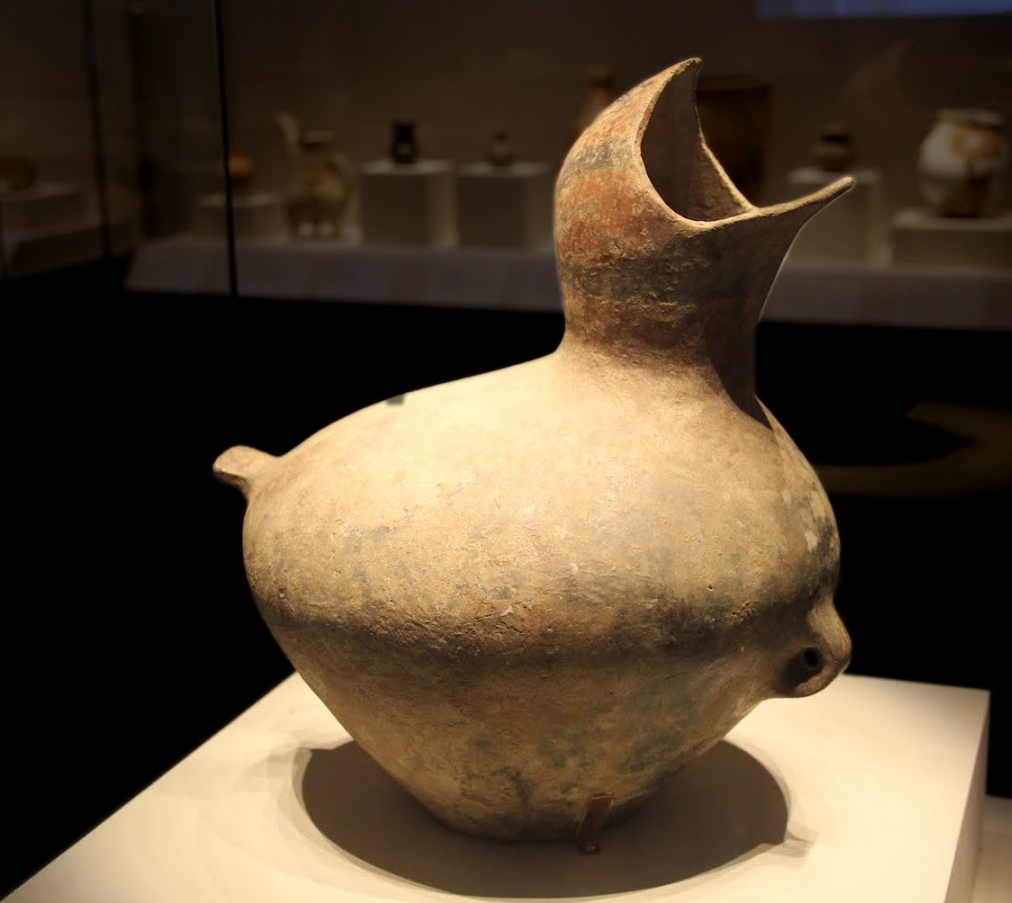
Painted terracotta jar in the shape of a fledgling, Xiaoheyan culture (3000-2600 BCE) final phase. Liao River region.

In northern present-day China, in Inner Mongolia and Liaoning, the Hongshan culture (ca. 4500–3000 BCE) was located in the Liao River basin. Agriculture held an important place alongside hunting and animal husbandry. The settlements were scattered, and family clans likely lived self-sufficiently in semi-subterranean houses with rammed earth floors and central hearths. Archaeologists believe certain indicators allow us to speak of social complexity within this culture: sites more developed than the surrounding small villages, ritual complexes such as Niuheliang (ca. 3650–3150 BCE), (Note: In 2012, (Liu & Chen 2012, p. 178), with 16 sites spread over 50 km², this is the largest complex of prehistoric ritual buildings ever discovered in China. This site is also isolated: no inhabited area has been found within a 100 km² radius.) which would have required elite-directed labor, and the jade craftsmanship used for these rituals—implying long-distance acquisition of raw materials, standardized forms and objects, and their distribution among elites. Large architectural complexes began to appear: cairns, altars, and especially the great "Goddess" temple at Niuheliang. This site contained seven clay-modeled female figures, some three times life-size—an entirely unprecedented theme at the time. On another ritual site, Dongshanzui, small clay-modeled birthing female figurines were also found. The Xiaoheyan culture (ca. 3000–2600 BCE), which followed the Hongshan culture, saw a fading of social distinctions and the eventual disappearance of these populations.

It seems, according to recent studies, that many jade artifacts previously attributed to the end of this period are post-Neolithic. However, jade appears to have attracted early interest, despite the considerable labor required to work it, as suggested by the originality of the forms that characterize the jade objects of this culture.

=== Northwest, Altai: Wheat and Barley ===
A study published in 2020 concerning the Tongtian Cave site in the Altai Mountains, which shows intermittent occupation dated between 3200 and 1200 years ago (coinciding with the global cooling during the transition from the Middle to Late Holocene), reveals the presence of barley and wheat grains. This pushes back the earliest known dates for the diffusion of wheat and barley in northern regions of Asia (the earliest documented cultivation—in 2020—was in the Fertile Crescent during the Pre-Pottery Neolithic B, PPNB, between the early 9th and early 11th millennia BCE).

The ecological environment around the site was slightly warmer and more humid at the time when people lived in and around this cave. These early low-intensity agropastoral populations in the northern steppe region played a major role in prehistoric trans-Eurasian exchanges.

== Final Neolithic ==
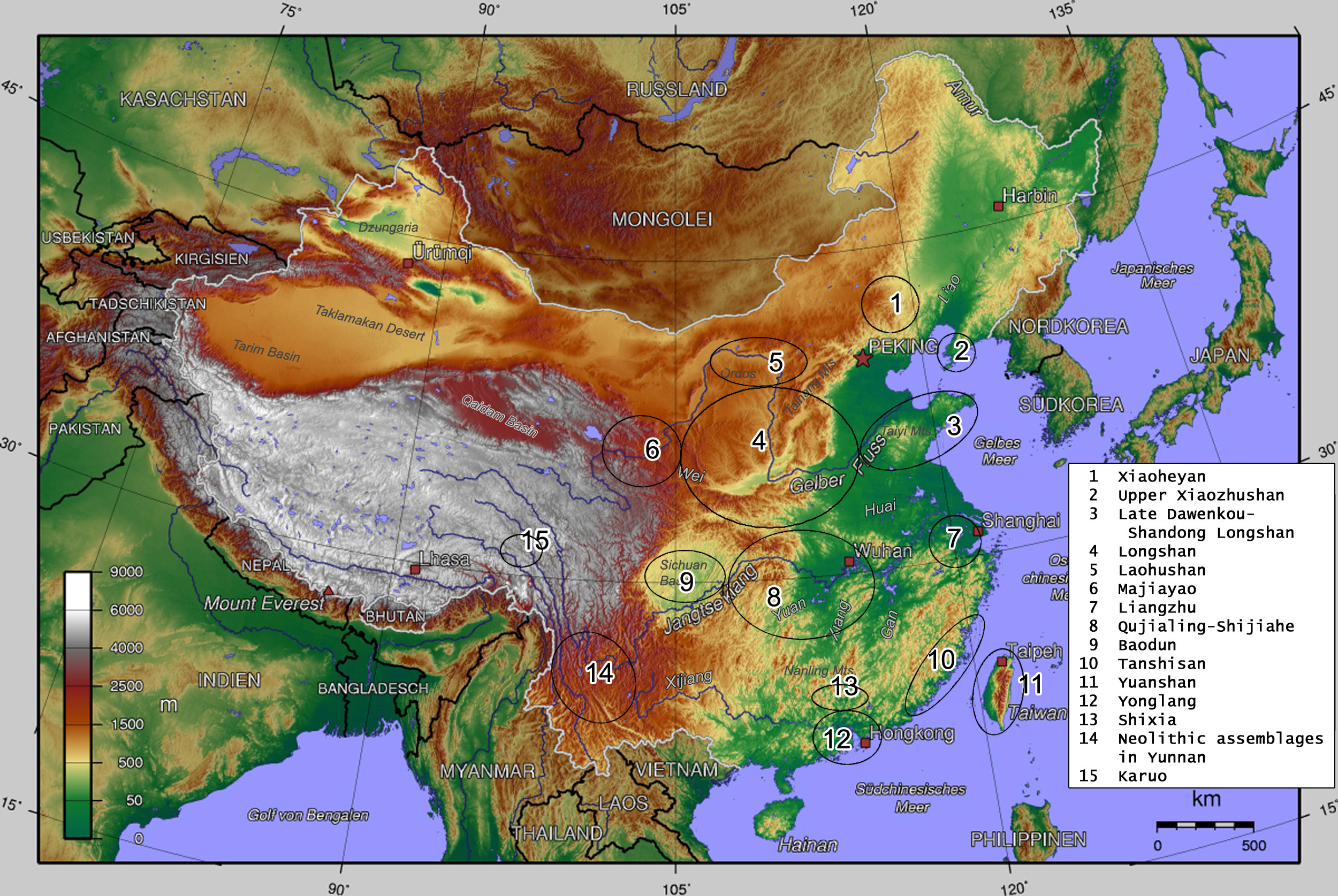
Final Neolithic cultures in China

To the west, and increasingly farther west, cultures developed at the exit of the Hexi Corridor, including that of Majiayao. In this region, which held a strategic position as an exchange zone between East and West, six cereal crops were found together for the first time. Some originated from the East, like rice and millet, and others from the West, like wheat and barley. The first bronze object discovered—a modest little knife—originated from a western exchange. Local populations would try to adopt this technology to create small objects in the following period. Additionally, these populations produced painted ceramics with geometric patterns, and sometimes anthropomorphic motifs, which were extremely rare in China at the time.

Furthermore, two cultures known as Longshan spread across vast areas: one in the middle reaches of the Yellow River, occupying the territory of the former Yangshao culture, and the other from the mouth of the same river in Shandong, but in more flood-prone landscapes. In the first cities that emerged during this period in the middle Yellow River region, numerous tombs were treated in a way that indicated the presence of an emerging elite. The very rich grave goods are markers of a society in which specialized artisans developed highly skilled craftsmanship. This same feature is found in the Longshan cultures of Shandong, where luxury black ceramics could reach the fineness of an eggshell.

During this period, around 4000 BCE, groups from southeastern China and Taiwan, belonging to the Austronesian language family (Austronesians), began moving from Southeast Asia toward Indonesia and as far as the islands of the southwestern Pacific. This culture is identified, in New Caledonia, by the archaeological site of the same name that first enabled the dating of this ancient migration: Lapita. According to phylogenetic research on Austronesian languages, these populations are believed to have invented the outrigger canoe—a relatively primitive canoe likely equipped with a rectangular sail, though not very efficient at sailing upwind. From island to island, this continuous migration and discovery process extended over millennia: the Lapita culture reached Oceania in the 2nd millennium BCE, and Lapita pottery appears around 1500 BCE in the Bismarck Archipelago. This exploratory migration then continued all the way to Easter Island and New Zealand.

Society during this period in China was highly hierarchical in many cultures, though not everywhere. Elites were particularly prominent in the east, within the Liangzhu culture, near the mouth of the Yangzi River, an area known for its rich production of paddy rice. Ostentatious signs of wealth multiplied, with large accumulations of finely crafted and carefully polished jade objects: the famous cong tubes and bi discs, whose use spread as far as western China, are the most well-known of these jade artifacts. A specific quarter of the settlement was set aside for these specialized craftsmen. Elite tombs were grouped in distinct clusters, set well apart from commoners' cemeteries. Another site farther south, Linjiatang (c. 3600–3000 BCE), in Hanshan County, Anhui Province, yielded numerous jades of unique forms, often drilled with minuscule holes—a highly complex technology that was already perfectly mastered at the time. In the west, the Qujialing and Shijiahe cultures saw cities surrounded by walls, and the presence of warriors is attested. As agricultural development led to significant population growth, resource pressure resulted in open conflicts.

In the south, populations seem unaffected by this pressure, these conflicts, or the social hierarchization. The agricultural communities developing in the hills and even on the Tibetan Plateau learned to cultivate various grains and edible plants at altitudes up to 3,000 meters. As for the populations living near lakes, rivers, and the ocean, they continued to benefit from abundant natural resources, without significant demographic impact. Well-established communication networks existed, yet each community continued to follow its own traditions, adapted to very different climates.

=== Upper Yellow River: Majiayao culture, c. 3300–2000 BCE ===
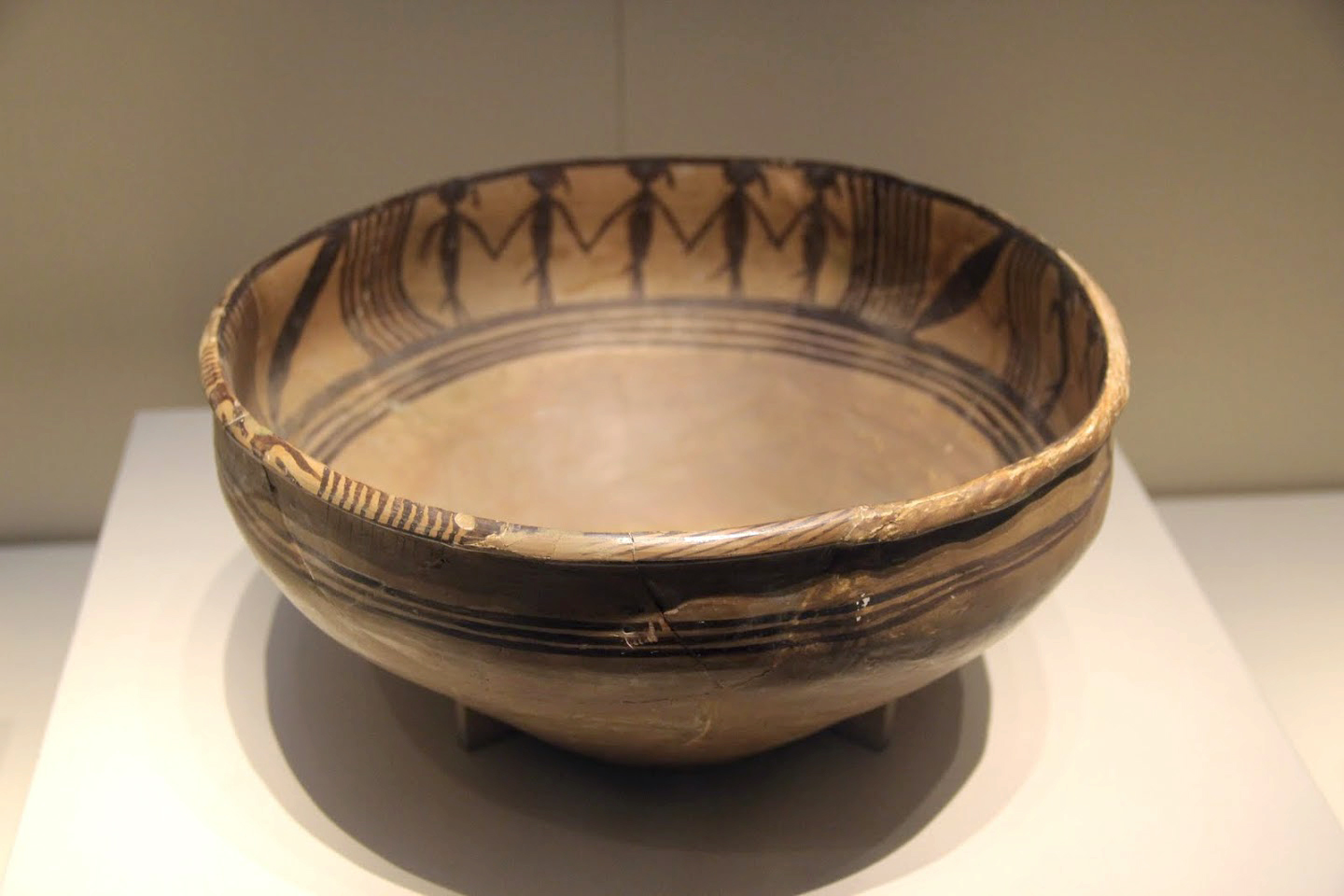
Ceramic basin painted with groups of dancing figures. Height 12.5 cm. Majiayao phase. National Museum of China

The Majiayao culture consists of three successive phases: c. 3500–2700 BCE, Majiayao proper; c. 2700–2000 BCE, Banshan; and c. 2500–1800 BCE, Machang, known from three different sites increasingly located toward the west, this displacement being linked to the pressure exerted by the Yangshao cultures (5000–3000 BCE), during the mid-Holocene climatic optimum. It remains a Neolithic culture in the northwest, along the upper course of the Yellow River. It is older, but then becomes contemporary with the important Longshan culture (2900–1900 BCE). It precedes the Qijia culture, which marks the transition to the Bronze Age.

Agriculture, hunting, and gathering were practiced there. This region, located in Gansu and at the border of the Hexi Corridor, was already a route and a zone of exchanges directed westward toward Central Asia and southern Siberia, and northward toward the Mongolian steppes. The Majiayao culture benefited from this, particularly in the area of cereal cultivation. Six cereals were found there: the earliest types of wheat, oats, and barley cultivated in China, originating from the Middle East (with the first cultivation around 4600 BCE), alongside common millet and broomcorn millet (first cultivated around 3000 BCE in Central China), as well as rice, originating from the Yangzi River valley. This region was therefore, from the third millennium onward, a very important point of exchange between East and West.

Painted pottery, remarkably abundant and highly elaborate in this culture, has been preserved in tombs. The study of the contents of these tombs seems to show, in the first phase, equality between men and women. Nevertheless, tools indicating gender-specific activities appear and thus differentiate the burials. Then, in the Machang phase, the final one, inequalities are evident: a male adult's tomb, for example, contained up to 85 ceramic vessels. These ceramics are painted with large brown and black brushstrokes. They are mostly large jars, often with anthropomorphic figures, the head coinciding with the opening or inscribed in the neck, sometimes in low relief.

=== Middle Yellow River: Longshan culture, c. 2900–1900 BCE ===
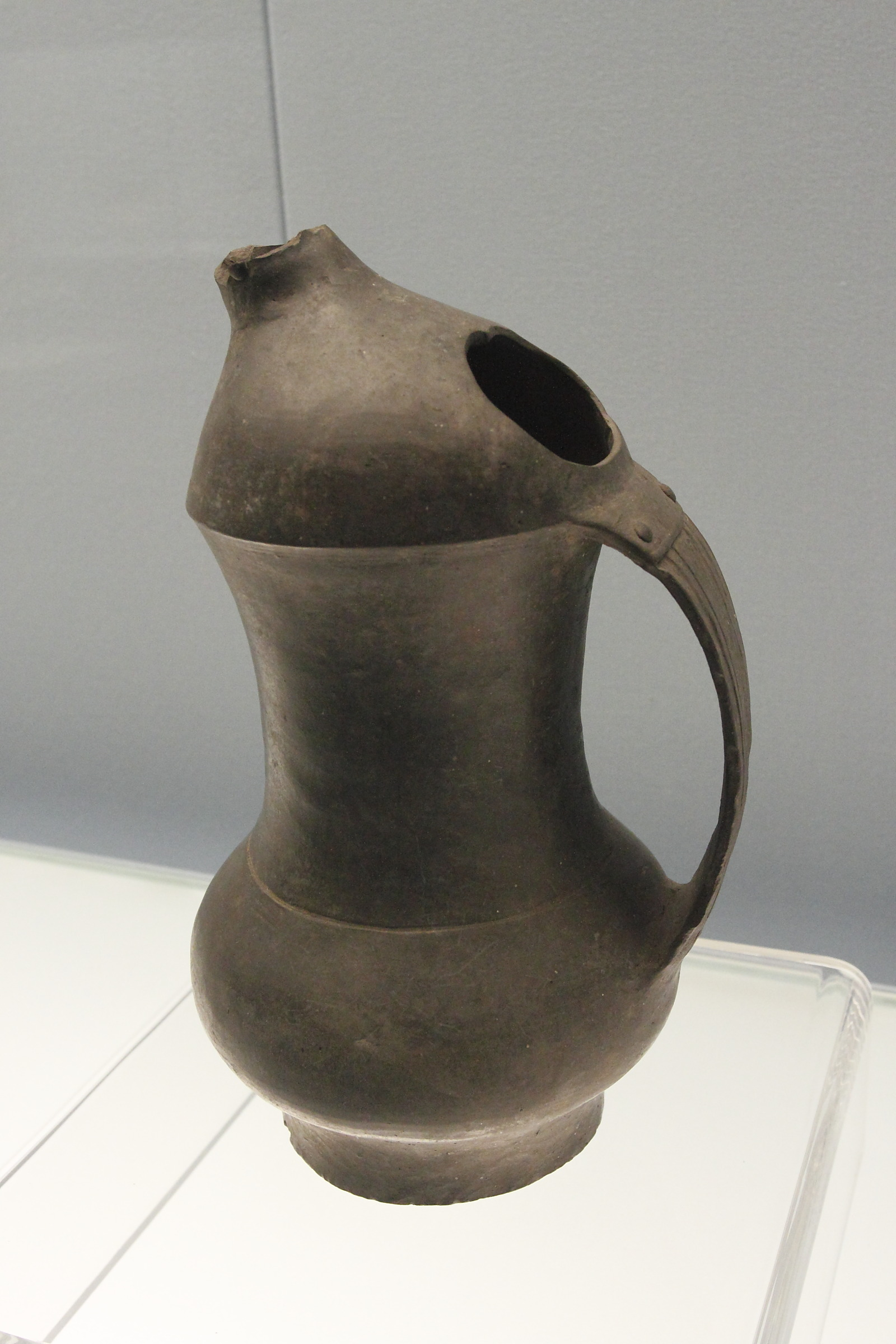
Pitcher. Fine, lustrous gray terracotta, Longshan of Shandong. (Note: This pitcher, considered to be of the he type, is interpreted as a prototype of a metal vessel: (Debaine-Francfort 1995, p. 321).) Shanghai Museum. Interpreted as a prototype of a metal container.

This culture extended over a very long period across two distinct geographical areas.

The first area spans the middle course of the Yellow River: Longshan of Henan (2900–2000 BCE). Fortified centers, up to 289 hectares in size, emerged, and the population increased. Some differences became apparent between an elite with tombs enriched by exotic deposits and a large population practicing collective burial. The pottery is light-colored. During the following period, in the Late Neolithic, in the southwest of Shanxi, the most famous city of the Longshan culture is Taosi (300 ha), dated between 2600 and 2000 BCE. Social stratification appears to be much more pronounced. The cong tubes and bi discs resemble those of the Liangzhu culture, despite being very far apart.

Corresponding to the end of the Longshan culture on the middle course of the Yellow River, in Shaanxi, a 2018 publication reports a fortified city (>400 ha), with stone walls, dating from the Final Neolithic to the beginning of the Bronze Age: Shimao (c. 2300–1800 BCE), "the first regional urban, political, and ritual center on the loess plateau of northern China." Elites were buried with elaborately crafted jade and bronze and/or copper objects, forming part of an assemblage of prestige and exotic items originating from distant regions.

The second area extends along the lower course of the Yellow River, Longshan of Shandong (2500–2000 BCE): the population also increased during this period. Many small villages are grouped around large centers, approximately 270 to 360 hectares in size. These centers, surrounded by walls, engaged in warfare. There was also the production of goods for exchange, but the possession of supply sources—salt, among others—could have been the cause of these conflicts. The distinguishing mark of the elite during this period is the possession of black ceramics, now particularly famous, as the walls of these prestige items are as thin as an eggshell and the surface perfectly polished. These are technical feats, but devoid of any applied, painted, or modeled decoration.

=== Yangzi River delta region: Liangzhu culture, c. 3300–2000 BCE ===
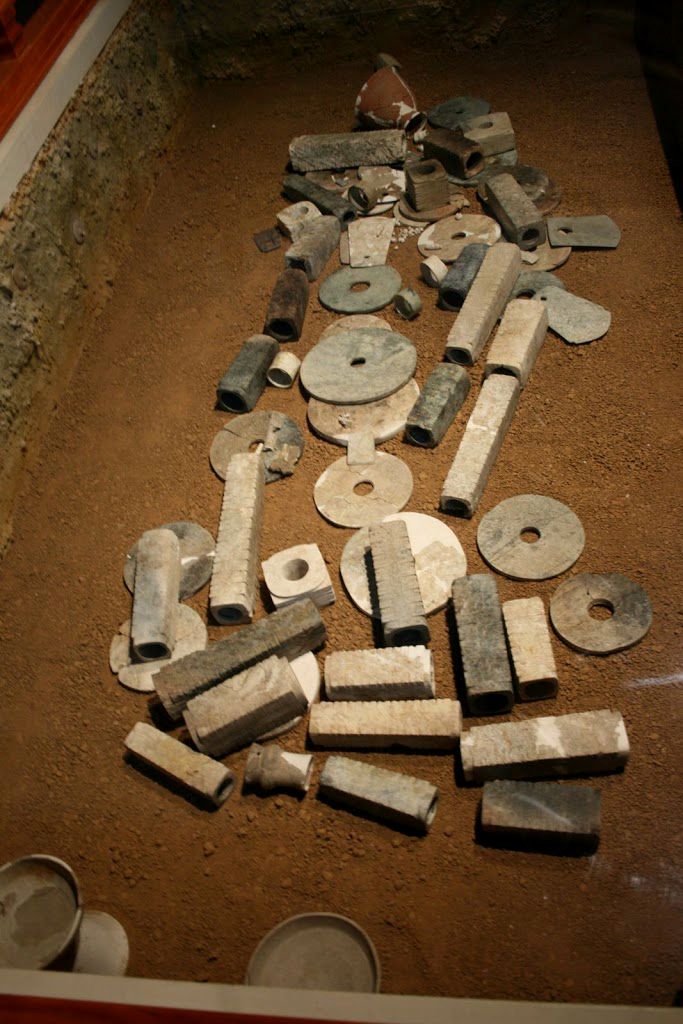
The Burial under the Jade. Tomb of the Liangzhu Cultural Elite. Nanjing Museum.

The Liangzhu culture, located in northern Zhejiang and southern Jiangsu near Lake Tai, (Note: Especially on the eastern part of the Tiaoxi River, where the Liangzhu site complex is located.) is the last Neolithic jade culture in the Yangzi River Delta. It was a center of intense and controlled jade production. Jade was worked according to models that spread rapidly throughout China—most notably the taotie motif, especially on tubes of varying lengths known as cong. Other jade forms also appear: the bi disc, ceremonial axes (yue), as well as pendants engraved with representations of birds, turtles, or fish. Jade, silk, ivory, and lacquer were deposited in elite tombs. More modest tombs contained only simple ceramics. The soil's acidity destroyed organic materials, particularly the bones of the elite, who were buried in elevated, sometimes terraced hills, which were drier than the lower areas used for more modest burials. Pictographic signs, possibly used to differentiate clans, appear on jade objects or pottery shards; one frequently recurring figure is that of a bird in profile facing left, placed on what appears to be an altar. This could be a form of proto-writing.

Agriculture then reached an advanced stage: it made use of irrigation for paddy rice cultivation (based on knowledge dating back to the Hemudu culture, c. 5000–4500 BCE) and also for aquaculture. Dwellings were generally located along rivers and ponds, while cemeteries—especially for elites—were placed on terraces that could reach up to 10 meters in height. Ritual practices were expressed through certain structures or altars shaped like multi-level wooden constructions with walls made of regular stone courses. The upper terrace was covered with a packed-earth floor.

=== Middle Yangzi: Qujialing culture, c. 3400–2500 BCE, and Shijiahe culture, c. 2500–2000 BCE ===
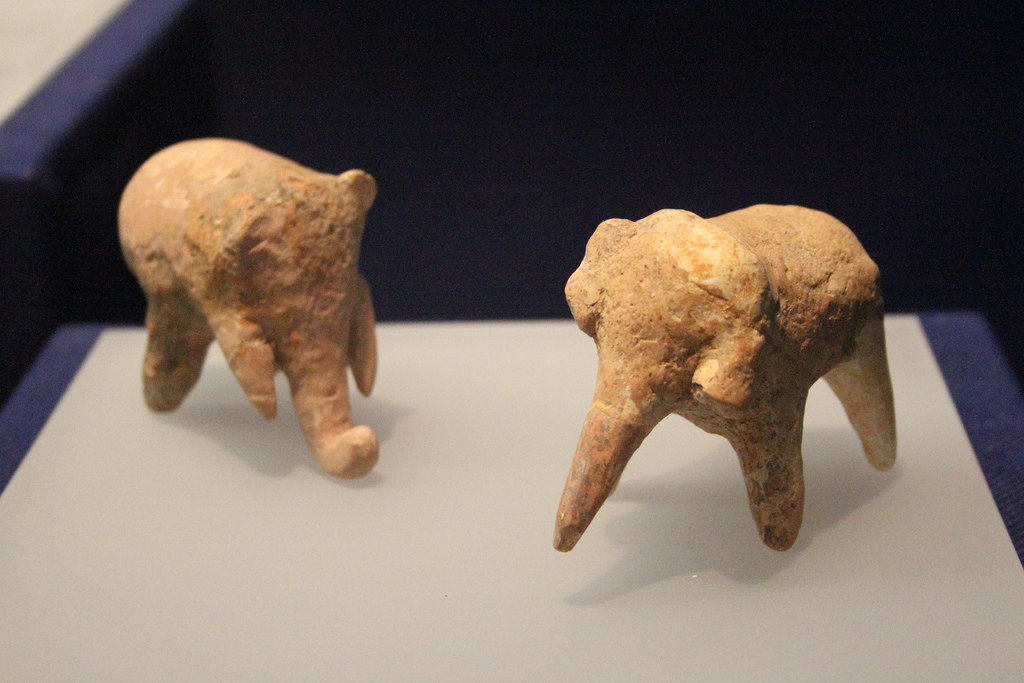
Clay figurines: two elephants. Height 6.8 cm.

Slightly east of the earlier Daxi culture, the two sites of Qujialing and Shijiahe—although chronologically separated—are part of a cultural complex that spread over a very large area centered on Hubei province. The vegetation consisted of forests of deciduous and evergreen trees, in a warm, humid subtropical climate, subject to occasional flooding. The disappearance of this culture seems to be associated with the drought that followed this period.

This period corresponds to the rapid expansion of walled cities: Qujialing reached 263 hectares and Shijiahe 800 hectares. These enclosures, as well as the image of a warrior equipped with a battle axe, suggest the emergence of rival warring city-states. The pressure on resources, due to population growth, may explain this rivalry. Technological exchanges with distant cultures are evident in the diversity of ceramics. Figurines remain similar to the small modeled figures of the Daxi culture, but many wheel-thrown forms appear. Traces of lacquered tableware have also been detected. The final phase of Shijiahe (c. 2200–2000 BCE) features numerous jade objects and funerary urns in elite tombs.

=== Tibetan plateau ===
The Neolithic period is attested in the Karuo culture on the Tibetan Plateau during the third millennium, particularly in the northeastern area near Chamdo. The eponymous Karuo site (1 hectare) is located on a terrace of the Lancang River (the name of the Mekong in China), at an altitude of 3,100 meters. In two meters of stratified deposits, traces of habitation dating from 3300 to 2300 BCE have been preserved. The population built dwellings and used pottery, stone tools—both chipped, including microliths, and polished. Similarities have been identified between these objects and those found in Sichuan, rather than with those from Gansu-Qinghai. Hunting, gathering, millet cultivation, and pig breeding were practiced there. Additionally, plants harvested at this time on the Tibetan Plateau show the presence, around 3200 BCE, of cereals (other than millet and of course rice) at altitudes above 3,000 meters. This tends to highlight the diversity of plant species selected here for their nutritional qualities suited to the environment and already demonstrates, at that time, the cultivation of a wide variety of crops beyond the three most commonly recognized staples: rice, wheat, and maize.

=== Southern China ===
==== Yunnan ====
Neolithic sites are rare in Yunnan before 3000 BCE, but in the following millennium three types of locations could accommodate them: terraces and caves near rivers, and shell middens along lakeshores. Stone axes and adzes have been found, as well as jars, plates, and bowls made of pottery. The ceramic paste sometimes contains traces of rice, indicating that rice was already being cultivated at that time. Recent excavations (in 2012) at the site of Haimenkou (Jianchuan County) revealed a group of stilt houses near Lake Jian (3000–1900 BCE), along with a substantial amount of material—rice (possibly originating from the Yangzi region) and millet (possibly from the northwest). The knives show similarities to those found in the Karuo culture of Tibet. All this seems to demonstrate that long-distance exchanges made this region something of a crossroads.

Southeast: Fujian/Taiwan: 3500–2500 BCE; Canton (Guangdong), c. 3000–2000 BCE; Shixia, Yonglang, Tanshishan; and c. 2300–1500 BCE Huangguanshan

In this highly diverse geographical environment, ancient populations developed dietary strategies that were each well adapted to their surroundings. While inland rice agriculture left numerous traces, on the coast, by contrast, people lived primarily from the abundant marine resources, similar to the Jōmon period in Japan. This situation continued into the second millennium, even as northern China entered the Bronze Age.

Canton region, c. 3500–2500 BCE, Xincun site (excavation 2008–2009 CE): In the vicinity of Guangzhou (Canton), in addition to fishing products, measurements taken on wooden tools used for pounding or grinding show that Neolithic people (around 3500–2500 BCE) consumed various starchy plants, possibly by cultivating them: fish-tail palms (Caryota sp., here close to Caryota urens) and tallpot palms, which may have been used to prepare sago, as well as banana, terrestrial ferns, lotus root, and Chinese water chestnut. At this time, rice represented only a small percentage of this food ensemble, whereas palms used for sago production made up the majority. Furthermore, the banana plant provided leaves for thatching, rainwear, fibers, edible shoots, and starchy, edible pulp from its stalk, already utilized in this remote period. Around 3000 BCE, rice cultivation had not yet reached the Xincun site, in the far south of Guangdong. These dates align closely with the known spread of rice across mainland Southeast Asia, which occurred around 2000 BCE, following a slow process. Around 3000 BCE also corresponds, according to current consensus, to the migration from southern China to Taiwan and beyond into Oceania, by speakers of Austronesian languages.

The Shixia culture, in northern Guangdong, was a society of farmers, and in their tombs were found cong tubes and bi discs—some of them identical to those from the Liangzhu culture. While the tombs and pottery are characteristic of their own culture, other artifacts show strong connections with the Neolithic cultures of Jiangxi and the lower Yangzi region.

The Yonglang culture developed in the Pearl River Delta and the Hong Kong region, on sand dunes. At that time, the sea level was lower, and the space between the ocean and the hills was wider. Villages were then built at the foot of the hills, and have today become dune sites. On the Hong Kong site, the stone tools include axes, adzes, arrowheads, and weights for fishing nets. The pottery, with simple shapes, features stamped decoration and cord-marked designs (a technique also found elsewhere in China, notably in the Yangshao culture). This corded decoration can be compared to that of the Corded Ware culture, a prehistoric European culture also characterized by pottery marked with impressions of rope—more precisely, cord wound around the fresh pottery and pressed into the surface. In contrast, in the Jōmon pottery tradition, it is braided rope that is rolled over the pottery surface. This technique is referred to by traditional African pottery specialists as the "roulette technique." This way of life relied on hunting and fishing, while rice cultivation was likely only a minor complement, scarcely detectable, though still indicating contact with the Shixia culture. Thus, although these populations knew about agriculture, they did not see the need to practice it extensively, thanks to an especially favorable environment.

The sites of Tianshishan (c. 3000–2000 BCE) and Huangguashan (c. 2500–1300 BCE), located on shell middens in Fujian, reveal different dietary strategies and additional external contacts. Here again, human groups lived off hunting and fishing, but traces of charred grains and phytoliths of rice, wheat, and barley have been identified at the Huangguashan site. Numerous adzes have been found, with a distinctive angular shape that remained unchanged for over 1,500 years. Many adzes were made from volcanic materials, which were imported; discoveries at a Fujian site suggest that these stones came from the Penghu archipelago, now part of the Republic of China (Taiwan). Moreover, clear similarities can be observed between the pottery from Penghu and western Taiwan. The possibility of long-distance maritime connections appears to have played a role in the spread of Proto-Austronesian languages, which are considered by comparative linguistics to be the ancestor of Austronesian languages (Note: The introduction of rice and social differentiation in Japan has been analyzed by Kumar 2009, who proposes to see in it the result of the immigration of elites from Java and Indonesia in general, a movement linked to the Austronesian expansion. (See also: Austronesian and theoretical linguistics. Amsterdam, Philadelphia: John Benjamins Pub. Co. 2010.) This Austronesian expansion forms an early connection between the territories that later became China, Java, Indonesia, and Japan.)—a family of languages that stretches approximately from Madagascar to Polynesia.

== Populations and genetics ==
A genetic study published in 2020 shows that genetic differentiation between northern and southern China was greater at the beginning of the Neolithic than it is today. The decrease in genetic differentiation between northern and southern populations over the following thousands of years is mainly linked to an increased proportion of northern ancestry in the southern region of China. The results suggest a significant migration that began as early as the middle of the Holocene, involving populations moving from northern China to the south. This migration appears originated from the Yellow River area.

== See also ==
- Neolithic
- Geography of China
- Prehistory of China
- Chinese art
- Chinese ceramics
- List of Bronze Age sites in China
- Prehistory of Taiwan
- Prehistoric Korea
- Japanese Paleolithic
- Jōmon period

== Bibliography ==
- "Regional" prehistory and archaeology, including China

- HABU, Junko; LAPE, Peter V; OLSEN, John W (2017). Handbook of East and Southeast Asian Archaeology. Springer-Verlag New York. ISBN 978-1-4939-6519-9.

- Prehistory and archaeology in China

- Archambault de Beaune, Sophie; Balzeau, Antoine (2009). La Préhistoire [Prehistory] (in French). Périgueux/Paris: CNRS. ISBN 978-2-205-06297-7.
- Archambault de Beaune, Sophie (2000). Pour une archéologie du geste : broyer, moudre, piler: des premiers chasseurs aux premiers agriculteurs [For an archaeology of the gesture: crushing, grinding, pounding: from the first hunters to the first farmers] (in French). Paris: CNRS. ISBN 2-271-05810-4.
- Aurenche, Olivier; Cauvin, Jacques (1989). Néolithisations : Proche et Moyen-Orient, Méditerranée orientale, Nord de l'Afrique, Europe méridionale, Chine, Amérique du Sud: Séminaire organisé à la Maison de l'Orient de 1984 à 1989 [Neolithization: Near and Middle East, Eastern Mediterranean, North Africa, Southern Europe, China, South America: Seminar held at the Maison de l'Orient from 1984 to 1989] (in French). Oxford: B.A.R. pp. 171–187. ISBN 2-271-05810-4.
- Bellezza, John Vincent (2014). The Dawn of Tibet: The Ancient Civilization on the Roof of the World. United Kingdom: Rowman & Littlefield Lanham. ISBN 978-1-4422-3461-1.
- Zhaofu, Chen (1988). Découverte de l'art préhistorique en Chine [Discover prehistoric art in China] (in French). Paris: A. Michel. ISBN 2-226-03386-6.
- Ciarla, Roberto; de Luca, Araldo (2005). L'Armée éternelle [The Eternal Army] (in French). Paris: National Geographic. ISBN 2-84582-168-9.
- Debaine-Francfort, Corinne (2001). La Redécouverte de la Chine ancienne [The Rediscovery of Ancient China]. Découvertes Gallimard / Archéologie (in French). Paris: Gallimard. ISBN 2-07-053352-2.
- Debaine-Francfort, Corinne (1995). Du Néolithique à l'Age du Bronze en Chine du Nord-Ouest: la culture de Qijia et ses connexions [From the Neolithic to the Bronze Age in Northwest China: the Qijia culture and its connections] (in French). Paris: Éditions Recherches sur les Civilisations. ISBN 2-86538-252-4.
- Demoule, Jean-Paul (2009). La révolution néolithique dans le monde: Séminaire du Collège de France [The Neolithic Revolution in the World: Collège de France Seminar] (in French). Paris: CNRS éditions. pp. 65–85. ISBN 978-2-271-06914-6.
- Elisseeff, Danielle (2008). Art et archéologie: la Chine du néolithique à la fin des Cinq Dynasties (960 de notre ère) [Art and archaeology: China from the Neolithic period to the end of the Five Dynasties (960 AD)] (in French). Paris: École du Louvre, Éditions de la Réunion des Musées Nationaux (Manuels de l'École du Louvre). ISBN 978-2-7118-5269-7.
- Guilaine, Jean (2000). Premiers paysans dans le monde : naissances des agricultures: Séminaire du Collège de France [The world's first farmers: the birth of agriculture: Collège de France seminar] (in French). Paris: Errance. pp. 171–187. ISBN 2-87772-187-6.
- Fang, Gu; Hongjuan, Li (2013). Chinese Jade: The Spiritual and Cultural Significance of Jade in China. New York: Better Link Press. ISBN 978-1-60220-129-3.
- Kumar, Ann (2009). Globalizing the Prehistory of Japan: Language, genes and civilization. London: Routledge. ISBN 978-0-203-88643-4.
- Chang, Kwang-chih; Pingfang, Xu (2005). The Formation of Chinese Civilization: An Archaeological Perspective. China: Yale University et New World Press. ISBN 0-300-09382-9.
- Li, He (2007). La Céramique chinoise [Chinese ceramics] (in French). Paris: Éditions de l'amateur / L'aventurine. pp. 17–25 & 105–107. ISBN 978-2-85917-246-6.
- Feng, Li (2013). Early China: A Social and Cultural History. Cambridge & New York: Cambridge University Press. ISBN 978-0-521-89552-1.
- Liu, Li (2004). The Chinese Neolithic: Trajectories to Early States. Cambridge & New York: Cambridge University Press. ISBN 978-0-521-64432-7.
- Liu, Li; Chen, Xingcan (2012). The Archaeology of China: From the Late Paleolithic to the Early Bronze Age. Cambridge & New York: Cambridge University Press. ISBN 978-0-521-81184-2.
- Zhiyan, Li; Bower, Virginia L; Li, He (2010). Chinese Ceramics: From the Paleolithic Period to the Qing Dynasty. Cambridge & New York: Yale University and Foreign Langage Press. ISBN 978-0-300-11278-8.
  - See the review of the book by Ellen Huang, in Project Muse in collaboration with the Milton S. Eisenhower Library: Huang, Ellen (2012). "Chinese Ceramics: From the Paleolithic Period through the Qing Dynasty ed. by Li Zhiyan, Virginia Bower, and He Li (review)". China Review International. 19 (2): 291–292. doi:10.1353/cri.2012.0038.
- Madsen, David B; Fa-Hu, Chen; Xing, Gao (2007). Late quaternary climate change and human adaptation in arid China. Elsevier. ISBN 978-0-444-52962-6.
- Jean-Luc Piel-Desruisseaux (2013). Outils préhistoriques: du galet taillé au bistouri d'obsidienne [Prehistoric tools: from the pebble carved with an obsidian scalpel] (in French). Dunod. ISBN 978-2-10-058826-8.
- Shelach-Lavi, Gideon (2015). The Archaeology of Early China: From Prehistory to the Han Dynasty. USA: Cambridge University Press. ISBN 978-0-521-14525-1.
- Schlanger, Nathan; Taylor, Anne-Christine (2012). La Préhistoire des autres: perspectives archéologiques et anthropologiques [The Prehistory of Others: Archaeological and Anthropological Perspectives]. Institut national de recherches archéologiques préventives (in French). Paris: La Découverte. ISBN 978-2-7071-7406-2.
- Steinke, Kyle; Ching, Dora C. Y (2014). Art and Archaeology of the Erligang Civilization. Publications of the Department of Art & Archaeology. Princeton University Press. ISBN 978-0-691-15994-2.
  - With contributions from Robert Bagley and Zhang Changping: "Preface" (PDF). press.princeton.edu. 2014. Archived from the original (PDF) on January 2, 2022.
- Underhill, Anne P (2013). A companion to Chinese archaeology. Chichester and Malden: Wiley-Blackwell. ISBN 978-1-4443-3529-3.
- Werning, Jeannette; Debaine-Francfort, Corinne (1991). Au long du fleuve Jaune : premiers villages, premiers vases du Henan: Musée départemental de préhistoire de Solutré, 21 juin - 15 octobre 1991 [Along the Yellow River: the first villages, the first vases of Henan: Departmental Museum of Prehistory of Solutré, June 21 - October 15, 1991] (in French). Solutré: Musée départemental de préhistoire.
- Shin'ichi, Nakamura (2005). "Le riz, le jade et la ville. Évolution des sociétés néolithiques du Yangzi" [Rice, jade and the city. Evolution of Neolithic Yangzi societies]. Annales. Histoire, Sciences Sociales (in French). 60 (2005/5): 1009–1034. doi:10.1017/S0395264900019351.
