= Alain Testart =

French social anthropologist

Alain Testart (30 December 1945 in Paris – 2 September 2013) was a French social anthropologist, emeritus research director at the Centre National de la Recherche Scientifique (CNRS) in Paris and member of the Laboratory for Social Anthropology at the Collège de France. He specialized in primitives societies (like those of the Australian Aborigines and the hunter-gatherers in general) and comparative anthropology. His research themes included: slavery, marriage arrangements, funeral practices, gift and exchange, typology of societies, the political, the evolution of the societies, and questions of interpretation in prehistoric archaeology.

With his works Alain Testart argued for the autonomy of anthropology as a social science and, against the anti-evolutionism that has dominated social anthropology over the past century, for a sociologically founded evolutionism. With force of arguments he contested naturalist approaches of the evolution of the societies that draw their explanatory models from evolution in biology. Based on a critical review of the foundations of ethnology, in particular of the work of Lewis H. Morgan, Alain Testart has attempted to renew an almost forgotten tradition in ethnological research, basing himself on the data acquired by a century of research in ethnography and prehistoric archaeology.

In his synthetic work Prior to history. The evolution of societies, from Lascaux to Carnac (2012) he has explained his scientific approach in a systematic way, and has designed a surprising panorama on the prehistory of the societies, including those of the Indo-European ensemble. With this book Alain Testart obtained a late recognition from a broad audience for his work as a sociological researcher. After his death a circle of friends and former colleagues has taken up the edition of unpublished works.

The following article shortly presents the social-anthropological oeuvre of Alain Testart at the hand of three of his research themes: the anthropology of hunter-gatherers; concepts of comparative sociology, and the evolution of the societies. In the footnotes web links point towards abstracts, papers, articles in scientific reviews, book critiques by others, colloquia and resources for further reference. An extract of his copious bibliography has also been included.

== An engineer in the social sciences ==
After graduating as an engineer from the École Nationale Supérieure des Mines in Paris, and after brief employment in an enterprise, Alain Testart began to study ethnology. In 1975 he received his doctorate with his thesis On the dualistic classifications in Australia: Essay on the evolution of social organization under the direction of Jacques Barrau. In 1982 he began working at the Centre National de la Recherche Scientifique (CNRS) and became, subsequently, a member of the team “Social appropriation of Nature” at the National Museum of Natural History, and of the Laboratory of Ethnology and Comparative Sociology at the Paris X – Nanterre University, where he carried out a number of educational assignments. Alain Testart was a member of the Laboratory for Social Anthropology at the Collège de France and an emeritus research directory at the CNRS.

== Anthropology of the Hunter-Gatherers ==
The first works of Alain Testart treat the social organization of the Australian Aborigines and of the hunter-gatherers, peoples who did not engage in any form of agriculture or animal herding at the time of colonization (Australian Aboriginals, San, arctic and subarctic American Indians, Pygmies, etc.).

=== The opposition Gathering / Storage ===
His book The Hunter-Gatherers, or the Origins of Social Inequalities (1982) rapidly became a classic among prehistorians. It revisits the classical opposition between hunter–gatherers and agriculturalists (or horticulturalists). This opposition was accepted as valid in both ethnology and prehistoric archeology, as was the notion of the Neolithic Revolution earlier advanced by V. Gordon Childe: a radical transformation of social and economic structures that was said to mark the transition from an economy of gathering and hunting to one based on the domestication of plants and crops. In his book, Alain Testart points out that more than half of the hunter–gatherer societies known to ethnology, in fact, share the same characteristics as agricultural societies: a sedentary society which indicates village life; an increased demographic density (higher than neighboring agriculturalists); significant hierarchies, including slavery and the differentiation in social strata such as nobles and commoners. These are typically the American Indians of the Pacific coast, of California and the peoples of Southeastern Siberia. These peoples, who only exploit wild (undomesticated) food resources like salmon, acorns etc., collect them in large quantities during the season of abundance and store them in order to provide for sufficient foodstuffs during the remainder of the year. These hunter–gatherers live on their stored food just as the agriculturalists live on the reserves of grain they keep in their barns or silos.

They thereby possess what Alain Testart terms a “techno-economical structure” analogous to that of the grain growers. As a consequence their societies are analogous as well. He proposes to substitute the classic opposition of hunter – gatherers and agriculturalists with a more general classification, depending on whether or not their economies rely on the large scale stockpiling of a seasonal, basic food resources. The evolutionary implications of this recasting are very clear. In no case it is possible to retain a unilinear conception. Rather, one finds an evolution which diverges, resulting, in one case, in food-storing hunter-gatherers, who remain unchanged into the 19th century and, in the other case, in agriculturalists, some of whom came to develop into very different forms of society.

=== The sexual division of labor as ideology ===
In a second work Alain Testart traces some invariance that one could almost term as transhistorical, as they are widely found in very different societies, including those of the first industrial era. One of these is how work is divided between men and women. A brief observation shows for instance that women are generally kept far from all professions related to blood (surgery, the armed professions, hunting, etc.). A consideration of the ethnographic data collected on hunter–gatherers shows that the division of tasks between men and women regarding gathering and hunting obeys a simple law: women are not excluded from hunting but from those forms of hunting that shed blood. With the Inuit, the Siberians and the Australian Aboriginals women can be observed hunting with nets and clubs, but never with bows and arrows or with harpoons. These data refute the idea that the sexual division of labor with hunter–gatherers could be based on nature (women not hunting because of repetitive pregnancies) and had no connection to economical rationality, because what could justify women hunting but not using typical hunting weapons?

In his Essay on the Foundations of the Sexual Division of Labor with the Hunter-Gatherers (1986) Alain Testart argues that this division must be based on an ideology involving the symbolism of blood. Finally relating these prohibitions or taboos regarding weapons to the very numerous taboos associated with the blood of menstruation, he shows how this ideology acts to prevent the blood shed by women from being confused or mixed up with the blood shed by men in the hunt.

== Concepts of Comparative Sociology ==
Alain Testart was often very critical about social anthropology; he reproached it for using concepts that are vague, inexact and much too simple, compared to the concepts used in the sciences of history or in the history of law. He maintains that for a scientific project in a comprehensive sociology it is of fundamental importance to consider small, precolonial stateless societies, that so far have been studied only by this discipline. According to Alain Testart, today's major scientific challenge when studying these societies is to be able to use the same terms and the same problematic as those used by the historical sciences. In this perspective he has reexamined a number of issues in order to define the terms with more precision.

=== Slavery ===
For instance: slavery, conceived as an extreme form of servile dependency, needs to be carefully distinguished from other forms like serfdom, the Roman colonat, helotism, etc. In Slaves, Debt and Power: Studies in comparative Sociology Alain Testart notices that the slave is not assigned a single typical way of life. This is particularly true for the slave of Antiquity: the slave of the latifundia and the slave who works at his master's side have very little in common; the gladiator and the Prince's favorite, who carries out important functions in the imperial offices, have even less in common. There is no single material and social condition characteristic of slavery. These slaves have in common only their legal status as slaves: to consider only the Greek and Roman examples, the favorite concubine of the master and the worker in the mines of the Laurion cannot have legitimate children. And, according to laws common to both classical Athens and ancient Rome, both the concubine and the miner are subject to torture when they are called to testify in a law court. The slave cannot be conceived of except as a clear legal category.

But the legal conditions of slavery, for instance in Ancient Rome and with the Ashanti, are not at all the same. They even completely change from the beginning to the end of the Roman empire, likewise they differ between the Ashanti kingdom and that of Abomey. This legal dimension needs to be enlarged to encompass a wider sociological characterization.

Alain Testart sees exclusion as one of the most important characteristics of the slave, he cites the work of Africanists who have shown that the slave in pre-colonial Africa was considered as a man “without kin”, as someone without a name and without descendants. The slave in Antiquity was excluded from the city state, namely from the rights associated with citizen status. According to Islamic law the slave could only be slave when he was an outsider to the community of the faithful at the time he was enslaved. In many old Asian kingdoms the slave had no connection to the king, did not pay taxes and was not obliged to serve in the military. Alain Testart summarizes these facts by saying that everywhere the slave was defined by an exclusion from areas considered as most fundamental by society. The nature of this exclusion could vary; in one society there is exclusion from parenthood, in another from the city state; in a third one from any contact with the Prince. This sociological characterization adequately distinguishes slavery from other forms of dependence.

=== The gift ===
He uses the same approach to propose a new definition of the gift. The difference between a gift and an exchange does not depend on a gift being returned: the regular exchange of presents is well known. Nor does the distinction depend on whether the reciprocity is expected: gift-giving with selfish motives also exists, giving something in the hope of getting back more in return (for example: the baksheesh). The radical difference between a gift and an exchange is that the gift-giver cannot legitimately claim a counter gift (even when he expects a gift in return, or when this hope is his most important motive), whereas the person who exchanges always has the right to demand compensation. The difference does not depend on the form of payment or on the motives of the actors. Here too it is the juridical aspect that enables us to distinguish both phenomena: the right to demand compensation characterizes the exchange but is absent with the gift. On this basis one can show that the kula with the Trobriand is not a gift but an exchange: one can compel compensation, by force if necessary. This is clearly not the case with the potlatch of the American Indians of the Pacific coast, which has to be characterized as a series of gifts and counter gifts.

These new theses, that are exposed in their main lines in A Critique of the Gift: Studies on non profit circulation lead to a reevaluation of the famous theories of Mauss, in particular of his idea of an “obligation to give in return”. Alain Testart reproaches Mauss for not specifying whether the nature of obligation is juridical or only moral and, by consequence, thus obscuring the nature and importance of the gift in history and in society. These theses are currently being widely discussed and debated.

== The Evolution of Societies ==
From his earliest writings, Alain Testart confirms himself very explicitly as an evolutionist. This is particularly true in the article The Question of Evolutionism in Social Anthropology from 1992. In this article he welcomes the often unappreciated originality of the great 19th Century anthropologists, primarily that of Lewis H. Morgan, but simultaneously criticizes their methods. Comparative anthropology or solely the observation of “pre-current” and current societies is in no case adequate for reconstructing the evolution of past societies and cultures. He underlines that this reconstruction has to rest on historical documents or on those of prehistoric archeology. For this reason he considers collaboration, as well as debate, with archeologists, whether prehistorians or protohistorians, to be extremely important.

This conviction led him to take a dual perspective on the funeral practices from both an archeological and an ethnological viewpoint, and to introduce a thesis on the origin of the State. Here he focuses on what he terms as “the accompanying dead”, referring to one or more men who must die in order to accompany the deceased. In Voluntary Servitude (2004, 2 parts) he examined all ethnographic and historical reports of this practice. It appears to have been extremely widespread in the past, not only in kingdoms, as is often thought, but in the societies based on lineage (in Africa) or in acephalous societies, like those of the American Indians of the Pacific coast. Slaves who have played the role of faithful servants to their masters are often implicated. It is the idea of fidelity that the master wants to take with him to his grave. Alain Testart points out that in ethnology one finds this practice in stateless societies, and in archeology in Neolithic societies, all of which indicates that it existed in non-State societies. It can also be found in certain forms of the archaic State. These data all indicate that the germs of a State power – and of despotic power – are present well in advance of the State. A powerful person derives his power from dependents, who depend on him to such a degree that they know they will not survive him. They are his faithful servants, and the ethnographic data show quite clearly that his power rests more on such servants than on kin. Family members having a dual liability because of having rights analogous to those of the pretender, which make them his potential rivals. The historical and ethno-historical data reveal numerous kingdoms, especially in Africa and in the Islamic world, where kings rely on “the slaves of the crown”; they even possess whole armies of slave regiments. How can we not see a continuity here? The “exceptional loyalty of the slaves”, as an Arab saying goes, provides a secure base for a power that wants to assert itself and, as Alain Testart maintains, to a power that want to assert itself in the form of a state.

== Main publications (French) ==
- 1978 Des classifications dualistes en Australie : Essai sur l'évolution de l'organisation sociale. Paris et Lille : Maison des Sciences de l'Homme & Lille III, 222 p.
- 1982 Les chasseurs-cueilleurs ou l'origine des inégalités. Paris : Société d'Ethnographie (Université Paris X-Nanterre), 254 p.
- 1985 Le communisme primitif : Économie et idéologie. Paris : Maison des Sciences de l'Homme, 549 p.
- 1985 Préface à L. H. Morgan : La société archaïque. Paris : Anthropos.
- 1986 Essai sur les fondements de la division sexuelle du travail chez les chasseurs-cueilleurs. Paris : EHESS (Cahiers de l'Homme), 102 p.
- 1991 Des mythes et des croyances : Esquisse d'une théorie générale. Paris : Maison des Sciences de l'Homme, 441 p.
- 1991 Pour les sciences sociales : Essai d'épistémologie. Paris : Christian Bourgois, 174 p.
- 1992 De la nécessité d'être initié : Rites d'Australie. Paris : Société d'Ethnologie (Université Paris-X-Nanterre), 290 p.
- 1992 La question de l'évolutionnisme dans l'anthropologie sociale. Revue Française de Sociologie 33 : 155–187.
- 1996 La parenté australienne : Étude morphologique. Paris : Ed. du CNRS, 392 p.
- 2001 L'esclave, la dette et le pouvoir : Études de sociologie comparative. Paris : Errance, 238 p.
- 2001 Moyen d'échange/moyen de paiement : Des monnaies en général et plus particulièrement des primitives. In Testart, A. (éd.) 2001 Aux origines de la monnaie. Paris : Errance (pp. 11–60).
- 2003 Propriété et non propriété de la terre : L'illusion de la propriété collective (1ère partie). Etudes Rurales 165-166 : 209–242.
- 2004 Propriété et non propriété de la terre : La confusion entre souveraineté politique et propriété foncière (2ème partie). Etudes Rurales 169-170 : 149–178.
- 2004 La servitude volontaire (2 vols.) : I, Les morts d’accompagnement; II, L’origine de l’État. Paris : Errance, 264 p. et 140 p.
- 2005 Éléments de classification des sociétés. Paris : Errance, 160 p.
- 2006 (2e édition, révisée) Des dons et des dieux : Anthropologie religieuse et sociologie comparative. Paris : Errance, 160 p. (Introduction et chapitre 1).
- 2006 Comment concevoir une collaboration entre anthropologie sociale et archéologie ? à quel prix ? et pourquoi ? Bulletin de la Société préhistorique de France 103(2) : 385–395.
- 2006 Interprétation symbolique et interprétation religieuse en archéologie : L’example du taureau à Çatal Höyük. Paléorient 32(2) : 23–57.
- 2007 Critique du don : Études sur la circulation non marchande. Paris : Syllepse, 268 p. (Chap. 1 : What is a gift ? and chap. 4 : Uncertainties of the ‛obligation to reciprocate’: A critique of Mauss).
- 2007 Clientèle, clientélisme, évergétisme et liturgies. In Lécrivain, V. (éd.) Clientèle guerrière, clientèle foncière et clientèle électorale : Histoire et anthropologie. Dijon : Éds. universitaires de Dijon.
- 2010 La déesse et le grain : trois essais sur les religions néolithiques. Arles, Actes Sud, 304 p. (extraits du premier chapitre).
- 2011 Les modèles biologiques sont-ils utiles pour penser l’évolution des sociétés? Préhistoires Méditerranéennes 2 : 1–18.
- 2012 Avant l'histoire : l'évolution des sociétés, de Lascaux à Carnac. Gallimard. (Table des matières et chapitre 2).
- 2013 Les armes dans les eaux. Questions d'interprétation en archéologie (sous la direction d'Alain Testart). Paris, Errance.(Table des matières et chapitre 1).
- 2014 L’Amazone et la Cuisinière : Anthropologie de la division sexuelle du travail. Paris, Gallimard, 192 p.

== Some papers available in English ==
2001 Slave that are not slaves, yet really are. Extended Summary in English of: 2001 L'esclave, la dette et le pouvoir : Études de sociologie comparative. Paris : Errance, 238 p.

2002 The Extent and Significance of Debt Slavery. Revue Française de Sociologie n°spécial 43 : 173–204. Translation of : 2000 : Importance et signification de l’esclavage pour dettes. Revue Française de Sociologie 41 : 609–641.

2010 Slavery, 6000 years ago. Translation of : 2010 (in collaboration with Ch. Jeunesse, L. Baray et B. Boulestin) : « Les esclaves des tombes néolithiques ». Pour la Science 396 : 74-80

2013 Reconstructing Social and Cultural Evolution: The Case of Dowry in the Indo-European Area. Current Anthropology vol.54, n°1, February 2013.

2013 What is a gift? and Uncertainties of the ‛obligation to reciprocate’: A critique of Mauss, translation of chap.1 and chap.4 of : 2007 Critique du don : Études sur la circulation non marchande. Paris : Syllepse, 268 p. (Critique of the Gift : Studies on non profit circulation).
