= Jacques Barrau =

French botanist and anthropologist (born 1925)

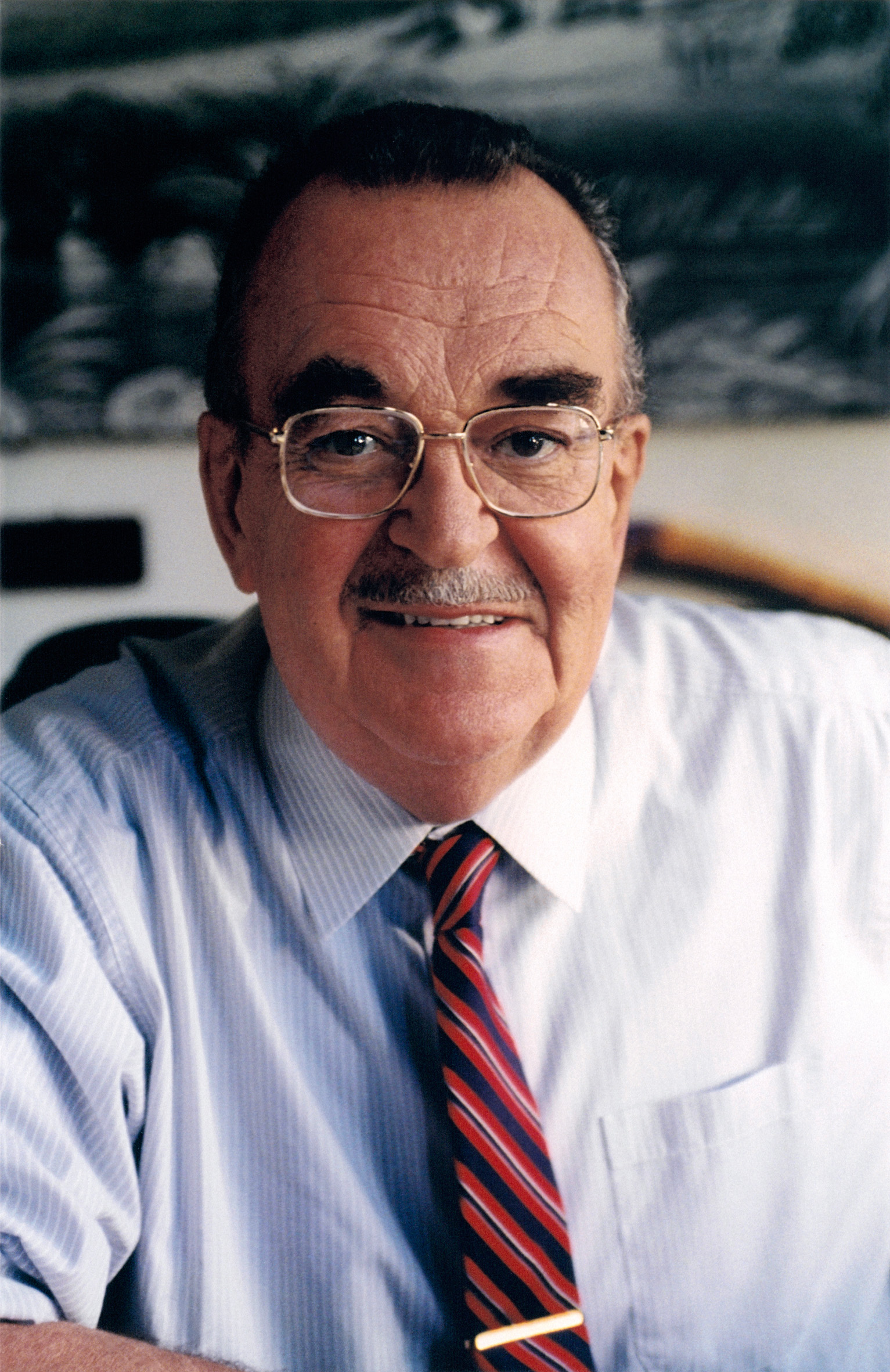
- Barrau in 1993
- Born: April 3, 1925
- Died: June 29, 1997 (aged 72)
- Scientific career
- Fields: Anthropology, agriculture, botany

Jacques Barrau (3 April 1925 - 29 June 1997 in Paris) was a French anthropologist, botanist and professor.

== Biography ==
Barrau was born in 1925 into a merchant family who had settled as French colonists in New Caledonia. He spent most of his childhood in Oceania before going to Marseille to be educated.

Barrau began his studies in 1942 at the University of Toulouse.

He volunteered to serve in the army during the Second World War from March 1942 to June 1944. On June 2, 1944, he was arrested by the German police in Toulouse and deported to Dachau concentration camp on the fr:Train de la mort. After surviving the train ride, he was sent to Neckarelz, which was part of the Natzweiler-Struthof concentration camp, and was liberated in 1945. Barrau recounted and illustrated his experience in Neckarelz in the bilingual French-German book "Dessins d’un camp: le camp de Neckarelz" (1992). For his service, Barrau was given the rank of honorary reserve captain as well as a military pension, plus multiple military decorations.

In 1946, Barrau obtained a diploma in Agricultural Engineering from the University of Toulouse (now the fr:École nationale supérieure agronomique). The following year, he continued his studies at the Faculty of Sciences of the University of Toulouse and at Aix-Marseille University, and earned his licencié ès-sciences, the equivalent of a modern undergraduate science degree.

Afterwards, Barrau became the head of the agricultural service department in New Caledonia from 1947 to 1952. This training in agriculture in Oceania led to a role researching economic development for the Pacific Community until 1964. While working, he obtained a PhD in natural science from Aix-Marseille University with two theses: "Les Plantes alimentaires de l’Océanie : origines, distribution et usages" and "Essai d’agronomie des atolls océaniens" (1957).

From 1964 to 1965, and again in 1969, Barrau was a visiting professor of ethnobiology at Yale University. In 1965, he was appointed as the deputy director of the Laboratory of Ethnobiology and Ethnozoology at the National Museum of Natural History, France. From 1966 to 1971, he worked for the Ministry of Overseas France as a technical consultant on issues in the French Pacific territories. After returning to the museum in 1971, he became the professor of the ethno-biology and -zoology department in 1981 and worked there until his death in 1997.

Over the course of his career, Barrau wrote or contributed to almost 300 papers and scientific works. He also published a book, "Strange patterns in the South Seas" (1961), under the pseudonym James Tressol.

== Academic and military decorations ==
- Officer of the Legion of Honour (1984)
- Knight of the Ordre des Palmes académiques (1981)
- Knight of the National Order of Merit (1966)
- Officer of the Order of Agricultural Merit (1961)
- Knight of the Order of the Black Star (1959)
- Croix de Guerre 1939–1945 (1945)
- Resistance Medal (1945)
