= Common millet =

Common millet is a common name for several plants and may refer to:

- Panicum miliaceum (proso millet), referred to as a common millet in recent decades
- Pennisetum glaucum (pearl millet), the most commonly cultivated millet
- Setaria italica (foxtail millet), historically referred to as common millet

== See also ==
- Common mullet
