= List of Major National Historical and Cultural Sites in Hunan =

This list is of Major Sites Protected for their Historical and Cultural Value at the National Level in the Province of Hunan, People's Republic of China.

Site	Chinese name	Location	Designation	Image
Mao Zedong's Former Residence	Shaoshan chong Mao zhuxi jiuju 韶山冲毛主席旧居	Shaoshan 韶山市	1-4	Upload file
Site of Joining Forces in Wenjiashi of Autumn Harvest Uprising	Qiushou qiyi Wenjiashi huishi jiuzhi 秋收起义文家市会师旧址	Liuyang 浏阳市	1-14	Upload file
Copper Column of Xizhou	Xizhou tongzhu 溪州铜柱	Yongshun County 永顺县	1-132	Upload file
Iron Sutra Column in Changde	Changde tiechuang 常德铁幢	Changde 常德市	2-44	Upload file
Former Residence and Grave of Huang Xing	Huang Xing guju 黄兴故居, Huang Xing mu 黄兴墓(墓)	Changsha County 长沙县	3-7	Upload file
Liu Shaoqi's Former Residence	Liu Shaoqi guju 刘少奇故居	Ningxiang 宁乡市	3-15	Upload file
Ren Bishi's Former Residence	Ren Bishi guju 任弼时故居	Miluo City 汨罗市	3-16	Upload file
Site of the Pingjiang Uprising	Pingjiang qiyi jiuzhi 平江起义旧址	Pingjiang County 平江县	3-27	Upload file
Yueyang Tower	Yueyang lou 岳阳楼	29°23′05″N 113°05′18″E Yueyang 岳阳市	3-66	Upload file
Yuelu Academy	Yuelu shuyuan 岳麓书院	Changsha 长沙市	3-75	Upload file
Wuxi Rock Carvings	Wuxi moya shike 浯溪摩崖石刻	Qiyang County 祁阳县	3-173	Upload file
Changsha Tongguan Kiln Site	Changsha Tongguan yao yizhi 长沙铜官窑遗址	Wangcheng County 望城县	3-224	Upload file
Chengtoushan Site	Chengtoushan yizhi 城头山遗址	29°41′30″N 111°39′20″E Li County 澧县	4-17	Upload file
Yandi Mausoleum	Yan di ling 炎帝陵	Yanling County 炎陵县	4-78	Upload file
Longxing Temple	Longxing si 龙兴寺	Yanling County 炎陵县	4-108	Upload file
Matian Drum Tower	Matian gulou 马田鼓楼	Tongdao Dong Autonomous County 通道县	4-178	Upload file
Ningyuan Confucian Temple	Ningyuan wenmiao 宁远文庙	Ningyuan County 宁远县	4-179	Upload file
Tan Sitong's Former Residence	Tan Sitong guju 谭嗣同故居	Liuyang 浏阳市	4-207	Upload file
Wei Yuan's Former Residence	Wei Yuan guju 魏源故居	Longhui County 隆回县	4-208	Upload file
Xiang Jingyu's Former Residence	Xiang Jingyu guju 向警予故居	Xupu County 溆浦县	4-217	Upload file
Site of the Headquarters of the South Hunan Uprising	Xiangnan nianguan baodong zhihuibu jiuzhi 湘南年关暴动指挥部旧址	Yizhang County 宜章县	4-230	Upload file
Nanyue Martyrs Shrine	Nanyue zhonglieci 南岳忠烈祠	Hengyang	4-239	Upload file
Yuchanyan site	Yuchanyan yizhi 玉蟾岩遗址	25°36′24″N 111°28′58″E Dao County	5-91	Upload file
Pengtoushan Site	Pengtoushan yizhi 彭头山遗址	Li County	5-92	Upload file
Bashidang site	Bashidang yizhi 八十垱遗址	Li County	5-93	Upload file
Laosicheng site	Laosicheng yizhi 老司城遗址	Yongshun County 永顺县	5-94	Upload file
Liuzi Temple	Liuzi miao 柳子庙	Yongzhou 永州市	5-363	Upload file
Quzi Temple	Quzi ci 屈子祠	Miluo	5-364	Upload file
Shaoyang North Pagoda	Shaoyang bei ta 邵阳北塔	Shaoyang	5-365	Upload file
Yueyang Confucian Temple	Yueyang wenmiao 岳阳文庙	Yueyang	5-366	Upload file
Ancient Building Complex of Zhanguying Village	Zhangguying cun gu jianzhuqun 张谷英村古建筑群	Yueyang	5-367	Upload file
Old Dong Architecture of Yutou	Yutou Dong zhai gu jianzhuqun 芋头侗寨古建筑群	Tongdao Dong Autonomous County	5-368	Upload file
Peng Dehuai's Former Residence	Peng Dehuai guju 彭德怀故居	Xiangtan County	5-499	Upload file
Liye Ancient City ruins	Liye gucheng yizhi 里耶古城遗址	Longshan County	5-519	Upload file
Gaomiao Site	Gaomiao yizhi 高庙遗址	Hongjiang	6-165	Upload file
Tanheli site	Tanheli yizhi 炭河里遗址	Ningxiang	6-166	Upload file
Shun Temple Site	Shun di miao yizhi 舜帝庙遗址	Ningyuan County 宁远县	6-167	Upload file
Old Buildings of the Shanggantangcun	Shanggantang cun gu jianzhuqun 上甘棠村古建筑群	Jiangyong County 江永县	6-670	Upload file
Old Buildings of Gaoyicun	Gaoyi cun gu jianzhuqun 高椅村古建筑群	Huitong 会同县	6-671	Upload file
Old Buildings of Taohuayuan	Taohuayuan gu jianzhuqun 桃花源古建筑群	Taoyuan County 桃源县	6-672	Upload file
Nanyue Temple	Nanyue miao 南岳庙	27°14′56″N 112°43′43″E Hengyang 衡阳市	6-673	Upload file
Old Architecture of Hongjiang	Hongjiang gu jianzhu qun 洪江古建筑群	Huaihua 怀化市	6-674	Upload file
Pingtan "Wind and Rain Bridge"	Pingtan fengyu qiao 坪坦风雨桥	Tongdao Dong Autonomous County 通道县	6-675	Upload file
Cai Lun Commemorative Temple	Cai hou ci 蔡侯祠	Leiyang 耒阳市	6-676	Upload file
Yu Family Memorial Arches	Yujia beifang 余家碑坊	Li County 澧县	6-677	Upload file
Old Fortress in Fenghuang	Fenghuang gu chengbao 凤凰古城堡	Fenghuang County 凤凰县	6-678	Upload file
Yanghua Rock Carvings	Yanghua yan moya 阳华岩摩崖	Jianghua Yao Autonomous County 江华县	6-848	Upload file
Shen Congwen's Former Residence	Shen Congwen guju 沈从文故居	Fenghuang County 凤凰县	6-1003	Upload file
He Long's Former Residence	He Long guju 贺龙故居	Sangzhi County 桑植县	6-1004	Upload file
Zeng Guofan's Former Residence	Fuhou tang 富厚堂	Shuangfeng County 双峰县	6-1005	Upload file
Qi Baishi's Former Residence	Qi Baishi guju 齐白石故居	Xiangtan County 湘潭县	6-1006	Upload file
Dongshan Academy	Dongshan shuyuan jiuzhi 东山书院旧址	Xiangxiang 湘乡市	6-1007	Upload file
Former Residence and Grave of Cai E	Cai E guju, gongguan he mu 蔡锷故居、公馆和墓	Shaoyang 邵阳市	6-1008	Upload file
Site of the First Education College of Hunan Province	Hunan shengli di-yi Shifan xuejiao jiuzhi 湖南省立第一师范学校旧址	Changsha 长沙市	6-1009	Upload file
Former Residence of Tang Shengzhi	Shude shanzhuang 树德山庄	Dong'an County 东安县	6-1010	Upload file
Former Site of the Hunan Provincial Committee of the Chinese Communist Party	Zhong-Gong Xiang qu weiyuanhui 中共湘区委员会旧址	Changsha 长沙市	6-1011	Upload file
Former Site of the Hubei-Hunan-Sichuan-Guizhou Revolutionary Base	Xiang E Chuan Qian geming genjudi jiuzhi 湘鄂川黔革命根据地旧址	Zhangjiajie 张家界市	6-1012	Upload file
Former Site of Tangtian Wartime Institute of Education	Tangtian zhanshi jiangxueyuan jiuzhi 塘田战时讲学院旧址	Shaoyang County 邵阳县	6-1013	Upload file
Former Site of the Japanese Surrender of Zhijiang in the Second Sino-Japanese War	Kang-Ri shengli Zhijiang qiaxiang jiuzhi 抗日胜利芷江洽降旧址	Zhijiang Dong Autonomous County 芷江县	6-1014	Upload file

== See also ==
- Principles for the Conservation of Heritage Sites in China
