= Wang Jin (archaeologist) =

Chinese archaeologist (1926–2020)

- 王劲
- Born: 12 December 1926; Huangpi, Hubei, Republic of China
- Died: 6 February 2020 (aged 93); Wuhan, China
- Occupations: Archaeologist, museum vice director

Academic background
- Education: Hubei Provincial Museum, Ministry of Culture, Institute of Archaeology of the Chinese Academy of Sciences, Peking University

Academic work
- Discipline: Archaeology
- Sub-discipline: Chinese prehistory
- Institutions: Hubei Provincial Museum, Hubei Archaeological Association
- Main interests: Jianghan Plain; Metallurgy

Wang Jin (Chinese: 王劲; 12 December 1926 – 6 February 2020) was a Chinese archaeologist whose research focus was on prehistoric sites in the Jianghan Plain. One of China's first female archaeologists, she was a member of the team that discovered the Neolithic Qujialing culture. She later led the excavation of major sites including the Tonglüshan ancient copper mine and the Shang dynasty city of Panlongcheng. She served as leader of the Hubei Provincial Archaeological Team, Vice Director of Hubei Provincial Museum, and President of the Hubei Archaeological Association.

== Biography ==
Wang was born 12 December 1926 in Huangpi, Hubei, Republic of China. She graduated from Hubei Second Women's Normal School in 1949.

She entered Hubei Provincial Museum in 1954, and received training in the archaeology program jointly conducted by the Ministry of Culture, Institute of Archaeology of the Chinese Academy of Sciences, and the history department of Peking University.

As one of China's first female archaeologists, she participated in the archaeological excavation in Jingshan that discovered the Neolithic Qujialing culture; she subsequently participated in the excavation of the Shijiahe site in Tianmen, Fangyingtai in Wuchang, and Maojiazui in Qichun.

Wang later served as the deputy leader and leader of the Hubei Provincial Archaeological Team. She led the excavation of the Tonglüshan ancient copper mine in Daye, the Shang dynasty city of Panlongcheng in Huangpi, the Qilihe site in Fang County, and the Mashan No. 1 Tomb in Jiangling. She also served as Vice Director of Hubei Provincial Museum and President of the Hubei Archaeological Association. She retired in 1990.

On 6 February 2020, Wang died of thoracic spinal tuberculosis in Wuhan, aged 93.

== Contributions ==
Wang's main research focus was prehistoric sites of the Jianghan Plain. Her pioneering work helped establish the framework of Neolithic cultures in the middle-Yangtze region. She explored the cultural interactions between the Central Plains and the Yangtze region, and deepened our understanding of metallurgical technologies of ancient China. Her main publications include:

- Panlongcheng (co-author)
- The Tonglüshan Ancient Mining Site (co-author)
- Fangyingtai in Wuchang (editor)
- Qilihe in Fang County (editor)
