= Shijiahe culture =

Neolithic culture in China

- Geographical range: middle Yangtze
- Period: Neolithic
- Dates: c. 2500 – c. 2000 BC
- Preceded by: Qujialing culture

Chinese name
- Chinese: 石家河文化
Transcriptions
Standard Mandarin
- Hanyu Pinyin: Shíjiāhé wénhuà

The Shijiahe culture (2500–2000 BC) was a Late Neolithic culture centered on the middle Yangtze River region in Shijiahe Town, Tianmen, Hubei Province, China. Named after its type site, the Shijiahe site cluster, it succeeded the Qujialing culture and inherited its unique painted spindle whorls. The culture is characterized by large-scale fortified settlements, advanced agriculture, and specialized craftsmanship, including distinctive jade artifacts and pottery figurines.

== Location, dating, discovery history, and environmental context ==
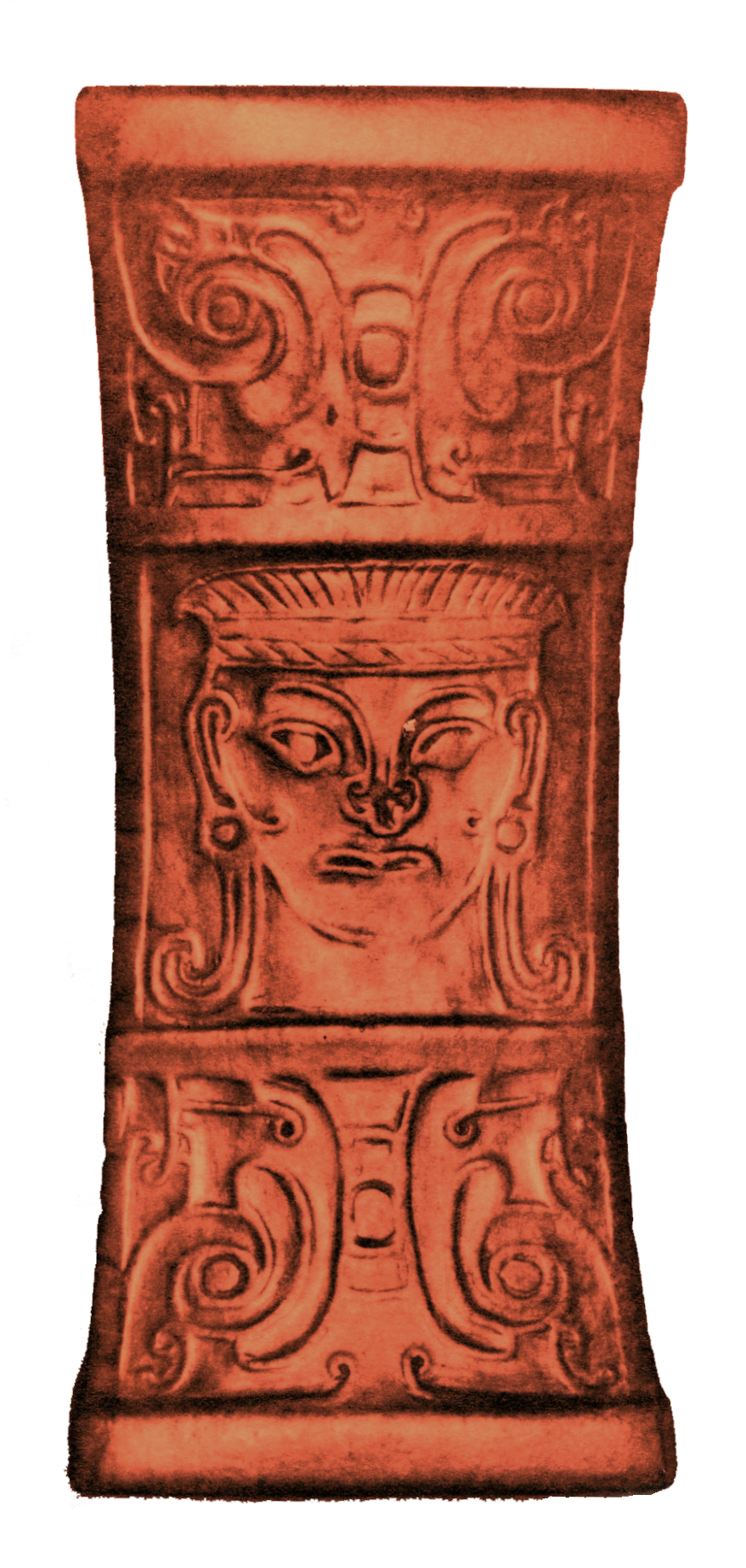
Jade ornament with face and masks, Shijiahe culture

The Shijiahe site, located in the Jianghan Plain of Hubei, was first identified in the 1950s, with initial excavations from 1955 to 1957. The culture spans approximately 2500–2000 BC. It thrived in the middle Yangtze region, bordered by the Dabie Mountains to the west, Dongting Lake to the north, the Three Gorges to the east, and the Nanyang Basin to the south. Most sites are located north of the Yangtze between modern Yichang and Wuhan, with some extending southwest to the southern bank, ideal for agriculture and trade via the Yangtze.

The region was dominated by wetlands, rivers, lakes, and marshes, with settlements built on raised ground to avoid flooding. Archaeological evidence from Dongting Lake reveals stilted structures from the Pengtoushan culture and Daxi culture, indicating a subtropical environment with deciduous and evergreen forests. Algae remains suggest periodic flooding, and the climate, initially warm and humid, became drier, transitioning to grasslands and scrub, coinciding with reduced human activity.

== Subsistence ==
The Shijiahe culture cultivated Oryza sativa (Asian rice), Setaria italica (foxtail millet), and Panicum miliaceum (common millet), alongside vegetables, amaranths, and plants now considered weeds. By the third millennium BC, irrigated rice paddies emerged, as seen at the Chengtoushan site with its reservoirs. The primary mode of travel was likely watercraft, with constructed channels connecting urban cores to rivers.

== Emergence of fortified settlements ==
The Shijiahe culture saw a significant population increase, with settlements quadrupling in number and increasing five- to sixfold in size by the middle phase, some reaching 800 ha compared to the Daxi culture's largest site, Chengtoushan (6–8 ha). Eight known sites were encircled by earthen walls or moats, which expanded until the middle phase before a sharp decline. At Chengtoushan, the moat was 40–50 m wide, requiring an estimated 200,000 to 470,000 laborers for construction. These fortifications likely served defensive purposes, reflecting early state formation and inter-city rivalries, as suggested by a warrior depiction with a yue-type battle axe at Xiaojia Wuji. Some scholars speculate Shijiahe could be considered an ancient state due to its advanced socio-political structure, potentially surpassing the centralization of Erlitou.

== Shijiahe site ==
The Shijiahe complex, spanning 8 km^{2} across terraces between two rivers, comprises about 40 dispersed sites, with a central settlement of nearly one square kilometer, the largest in Neolithic China. Originating as a small Daxi-era village, it grew into a fortified agglomeration, covering 120 ha with earthen walls and moats up to 100 m wide to manage flooding from the Han River and local streams. Houses included concave-shaped structures, enclosed courtyards, and interlinked buildings, typically housing 20–30 people per courtyard, suggesting clan-based units. Larger dwellings likely served elite or specialized functions, and cemeteries near courtyards with about 20 graves reinforce the clan-based social structure. The lower layer of the site belonged to the Qujialing culture, indicating continuity.

== Craftsmanship, funerary practices, and symbolism ==
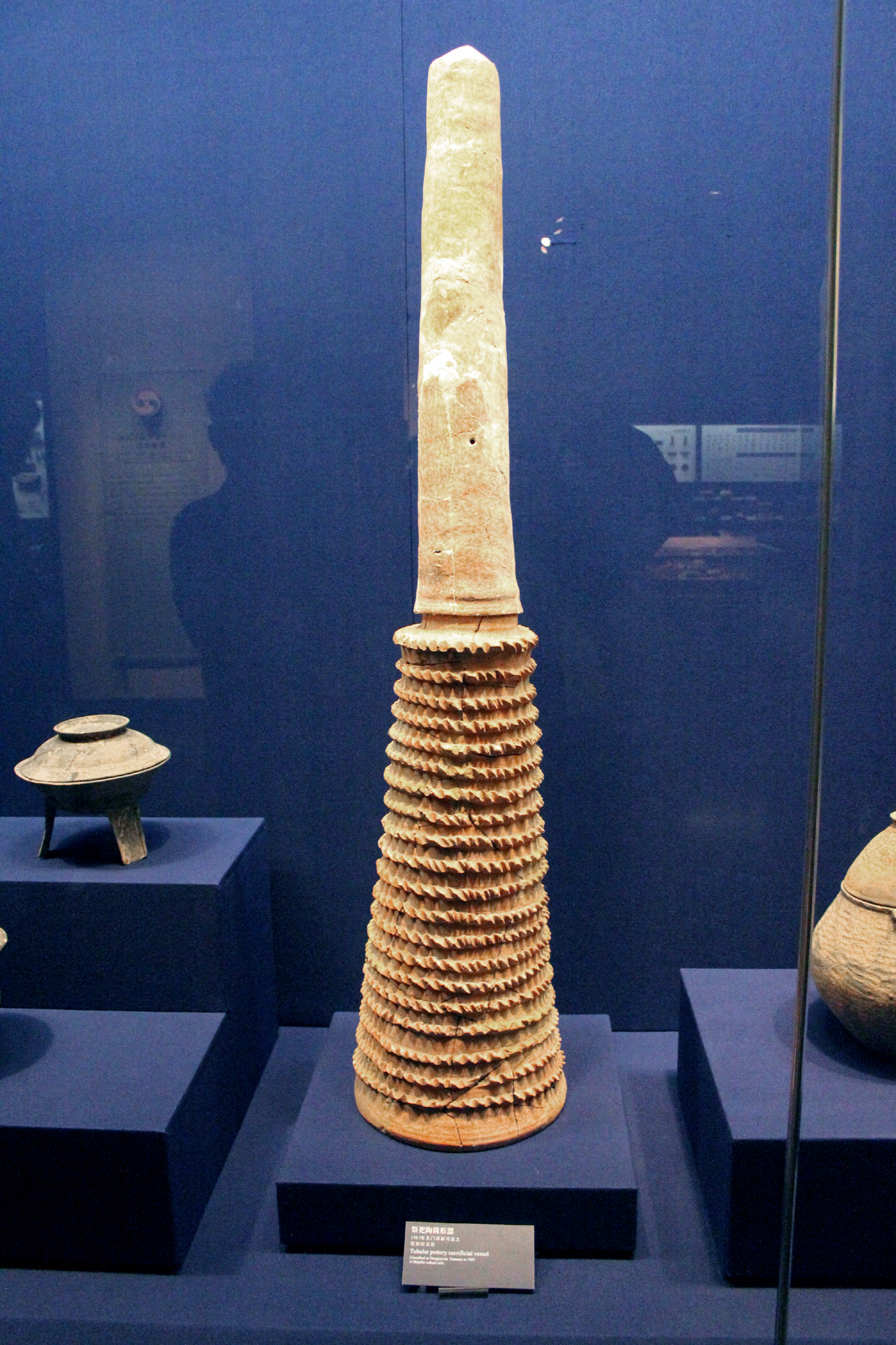
Tubular pottery sacrificial vessel found in Dengjiawan site (邓家湾), Hubei Provincial Museum

Specialized craft production was prominent, with Dengjiawan yielding over 10,000 clay figurines (5–10 cm) depicting birds, hens, dogs, sheep, turtles, pigs, elephants, tigers, and humans, some in dance poses or holding a fish, likely for religious purposes. Similar figurines were found in Hunan and Henan. Other sites produced thousands of red pottery cups and stone drills, indicating pottery and jade workshops. In the late phase (2200–2000 BC), jade became prominent in burials, with some tombs containing up to 56 pieces, including anthropomorphic figures, monstrous forms, cong tubes, birds, dragons, cicadas, and phoenixes, resembling Liangzhu culture artifacts. At Tanjialing, over 250 jade pieces were found in five tombs, showcasing advanced carving techniques surpassing those of Liangzhu and Hongshan. One male burial included 99 pottery jars. Early copper objects, the southernmost in Neolithic China, were also found at Dengjiawan.

== Decline ==
By 2000 BC, fortifications were no longer maintained, and the population declined significantly, possibly due to warfare with the expanding Longshan culture, flooding, or collapse of social order. A severe drought around 4200 cal BP eroded the economic foundation of rice cultivation. Unlike the abrupt collapse of the Liangzhu culture, Shijiahe experienced a gradual decline.

== Gallery ==
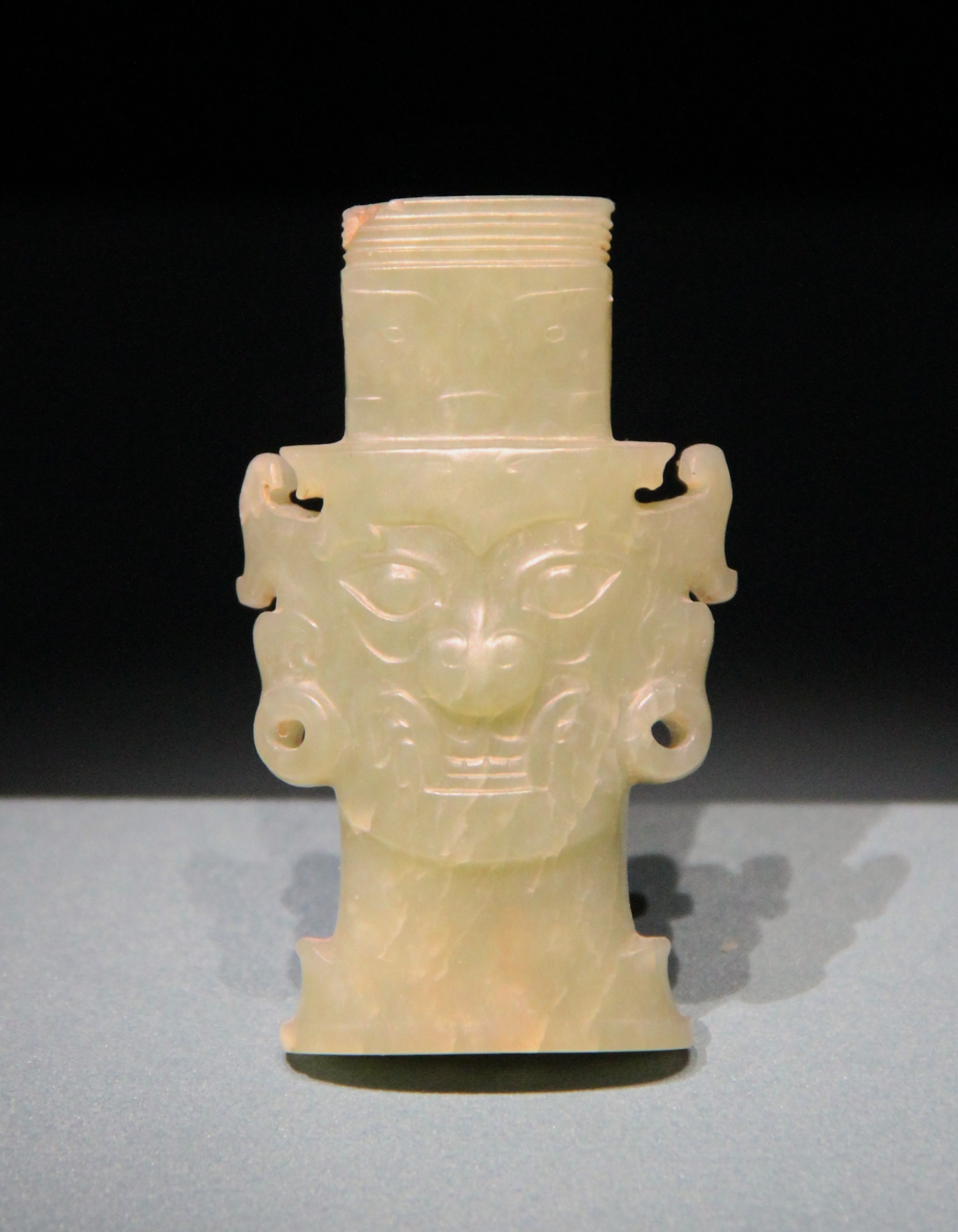
Jade plaque with face

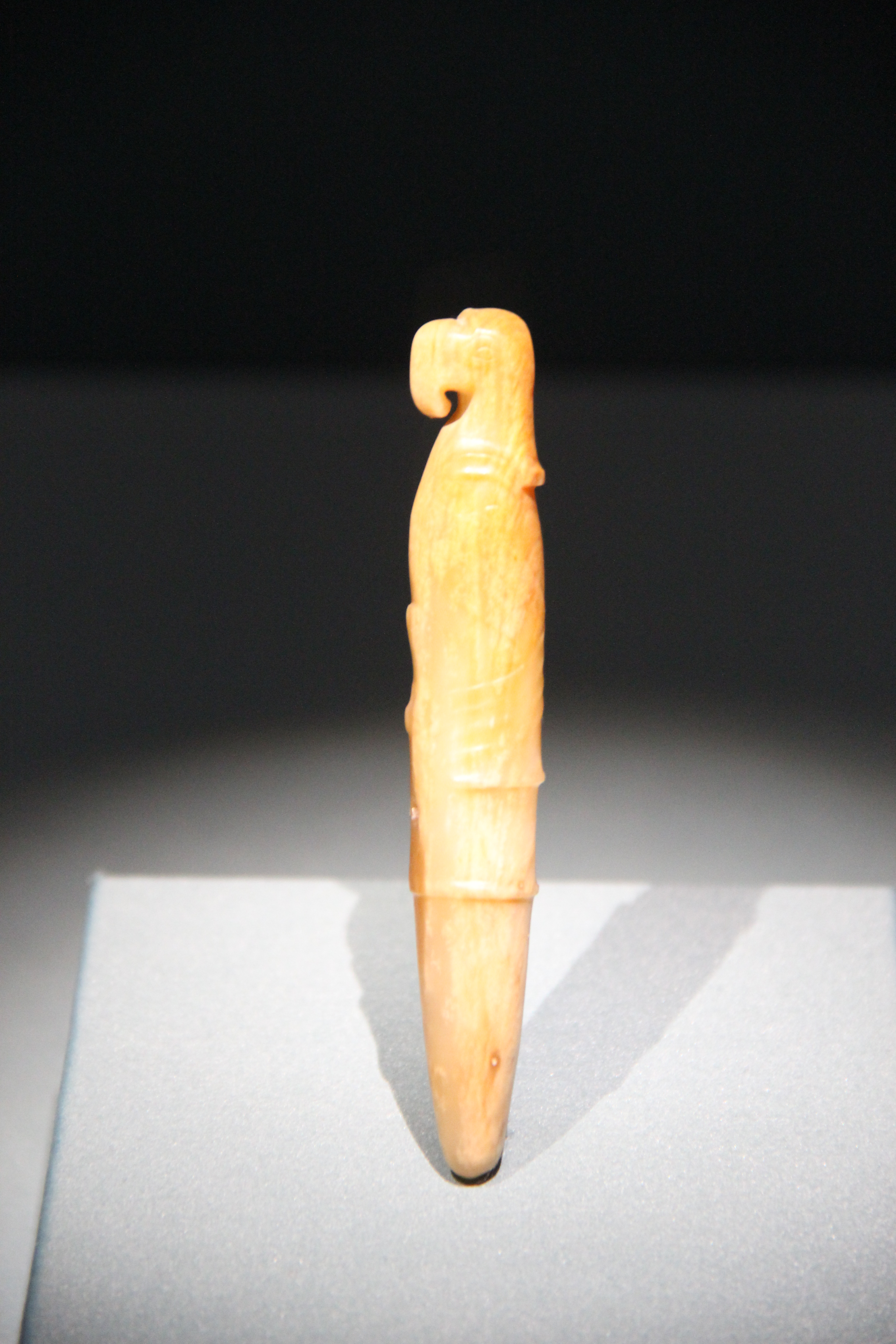
Jade bird

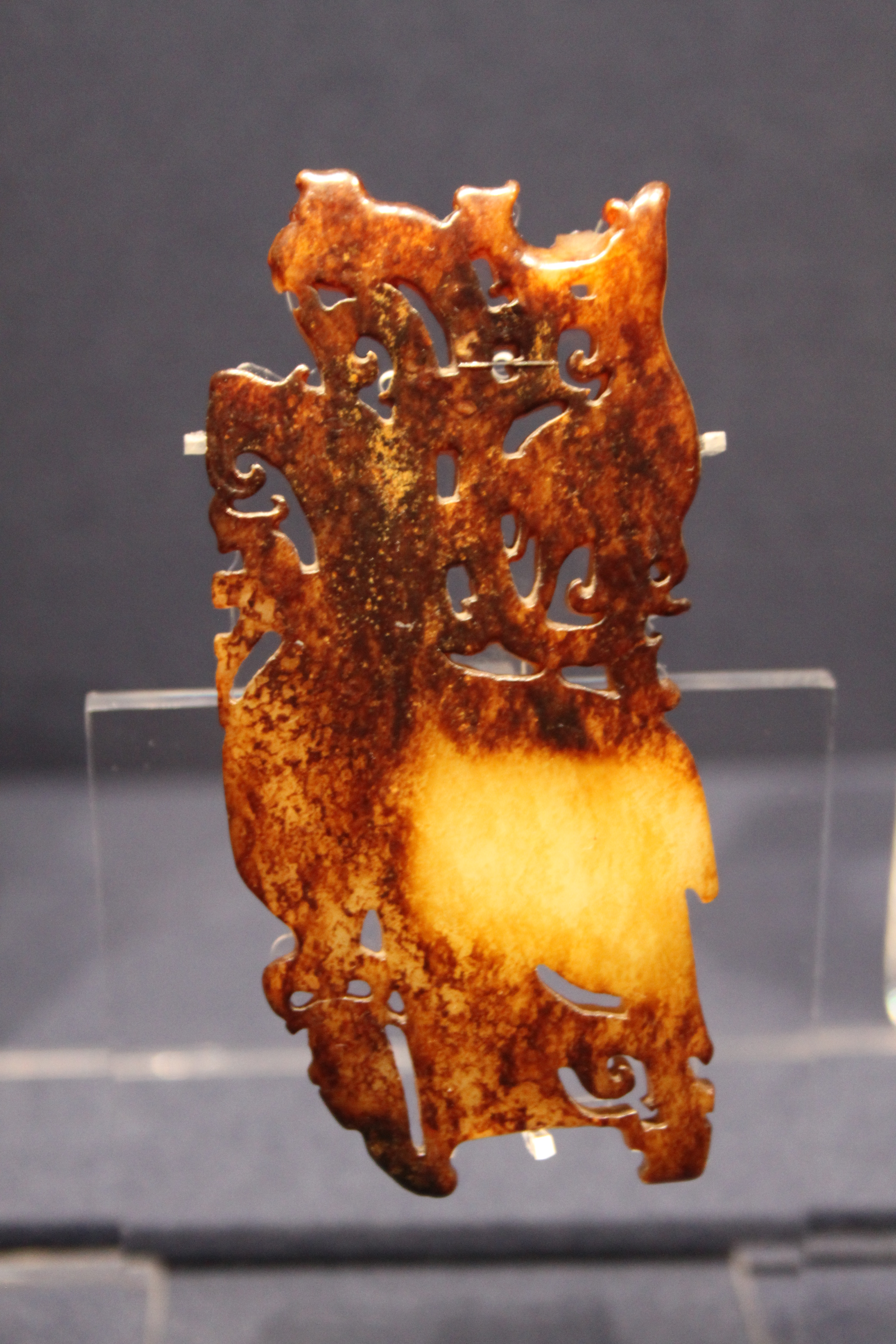
Jade pendant

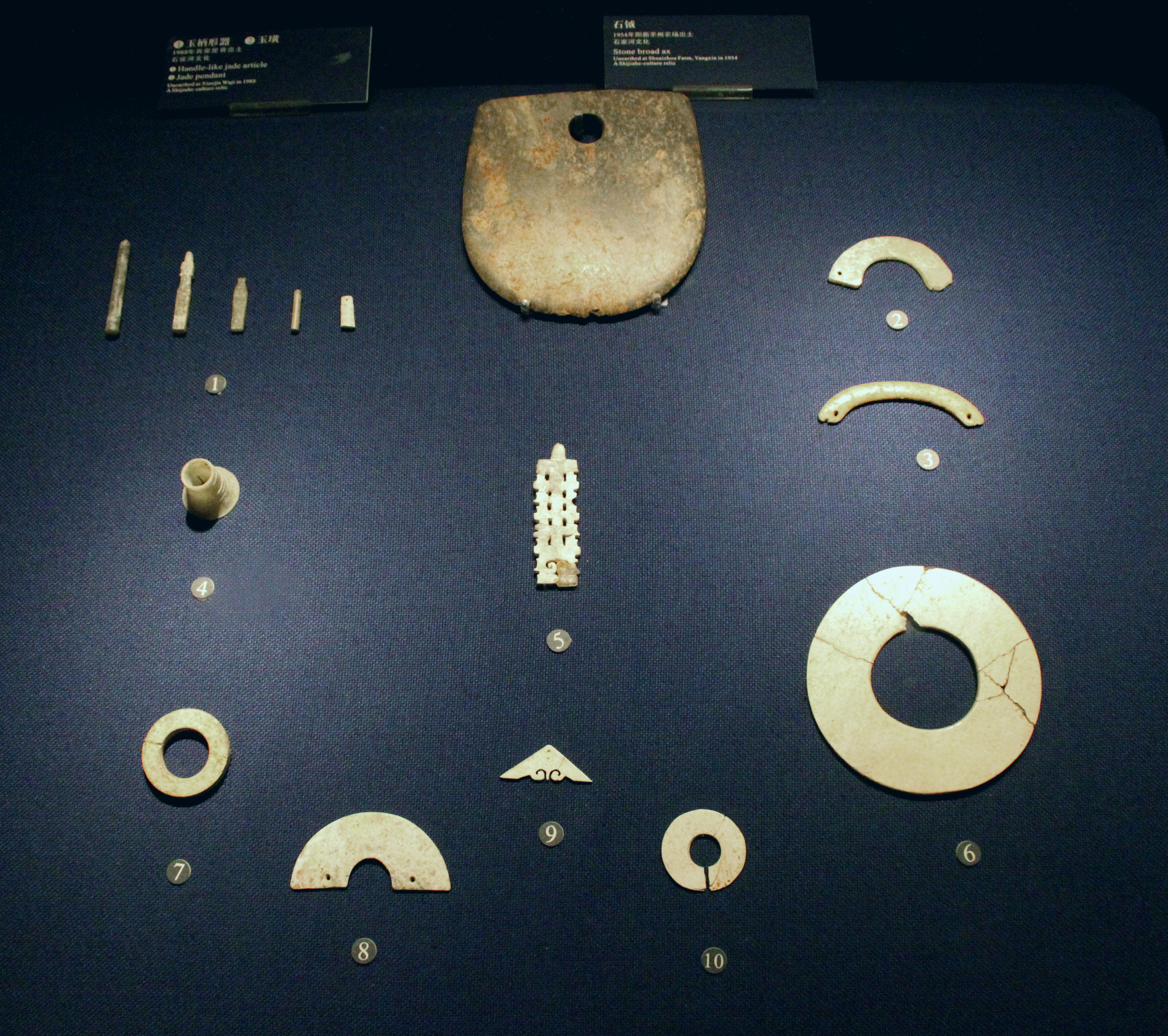

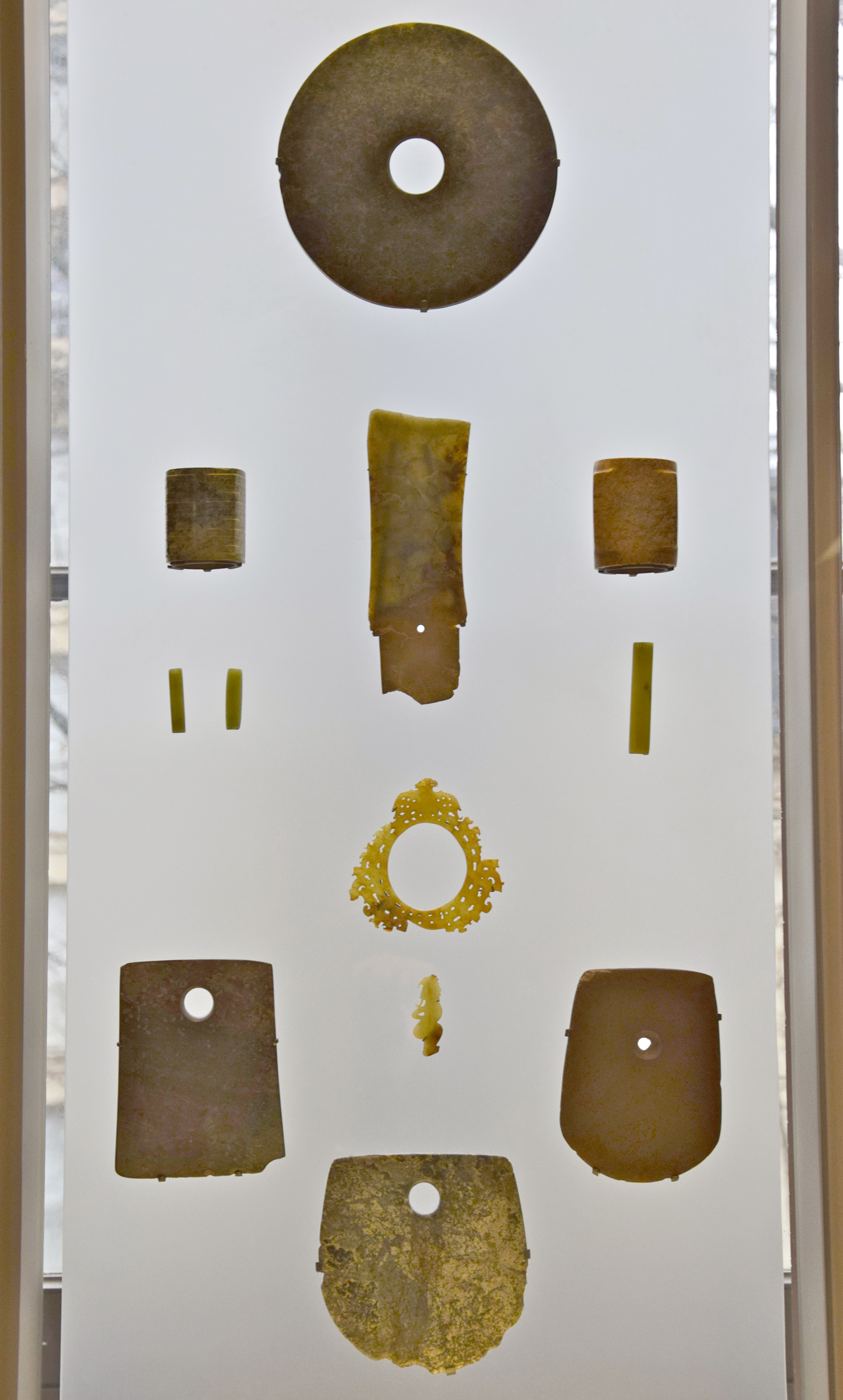

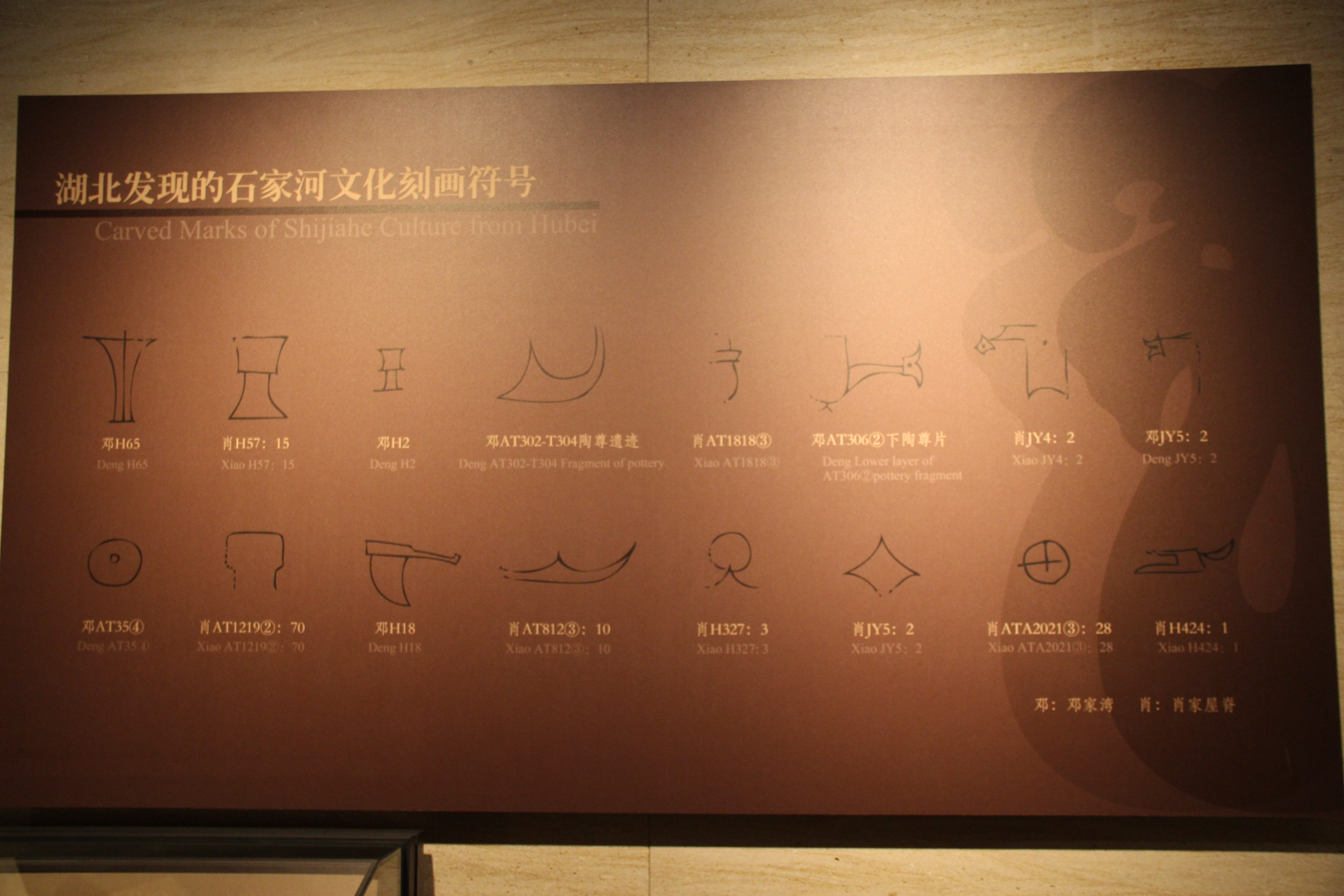
Markings of pottery

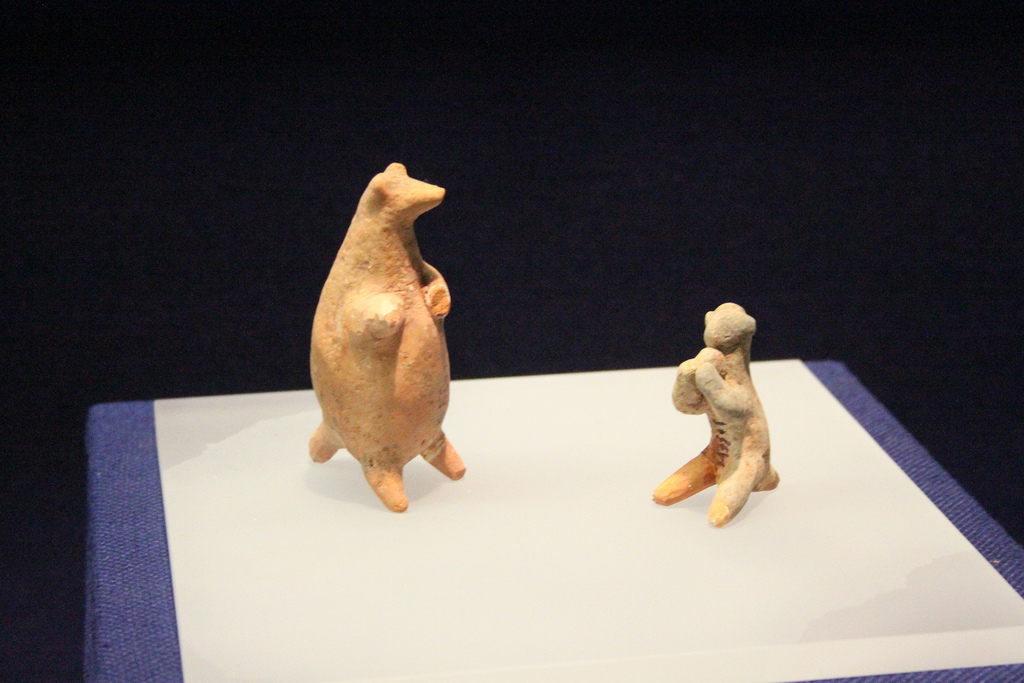
Clay figurines: bear and monkey

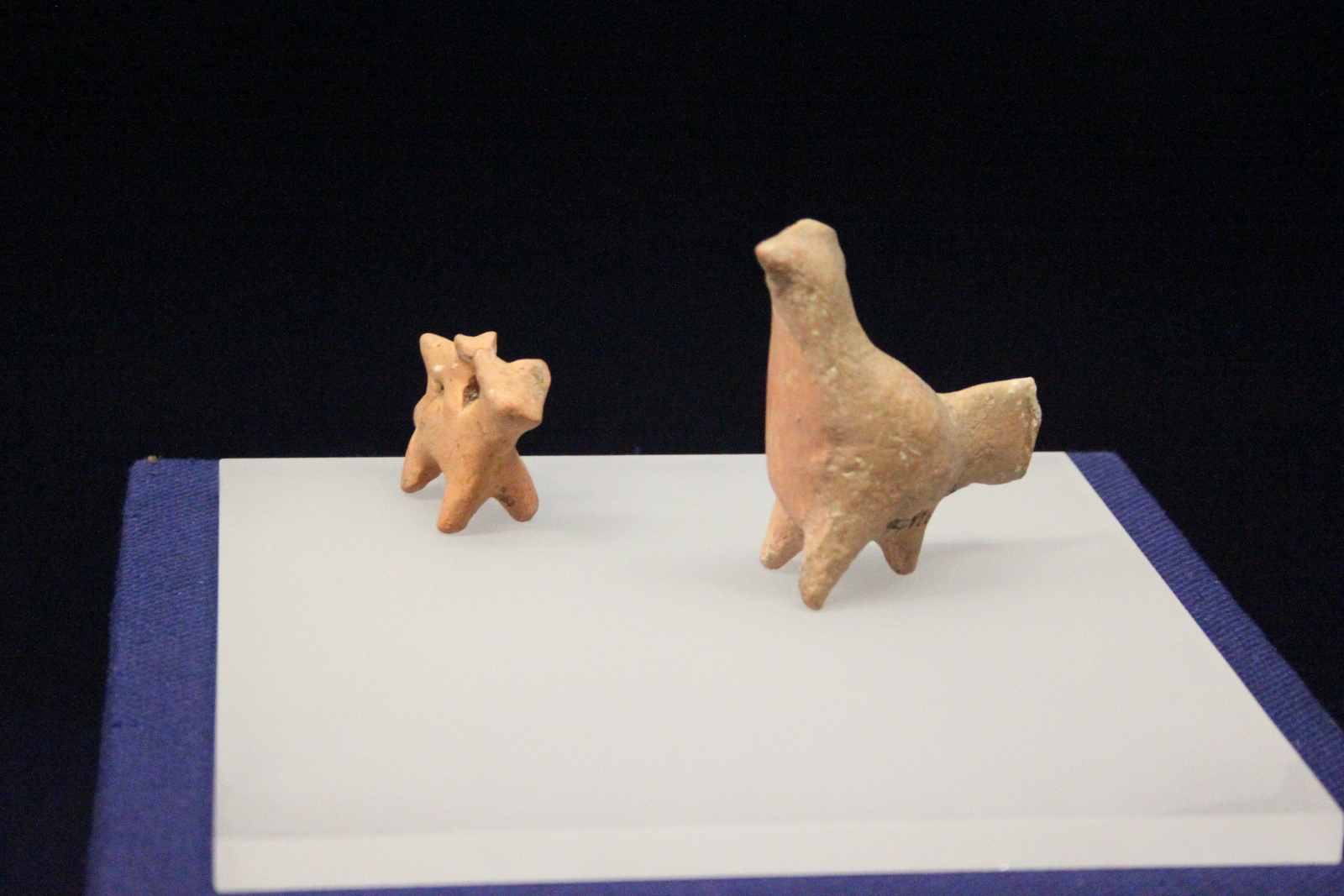
Clay figurines: dog with fish(?) and hen

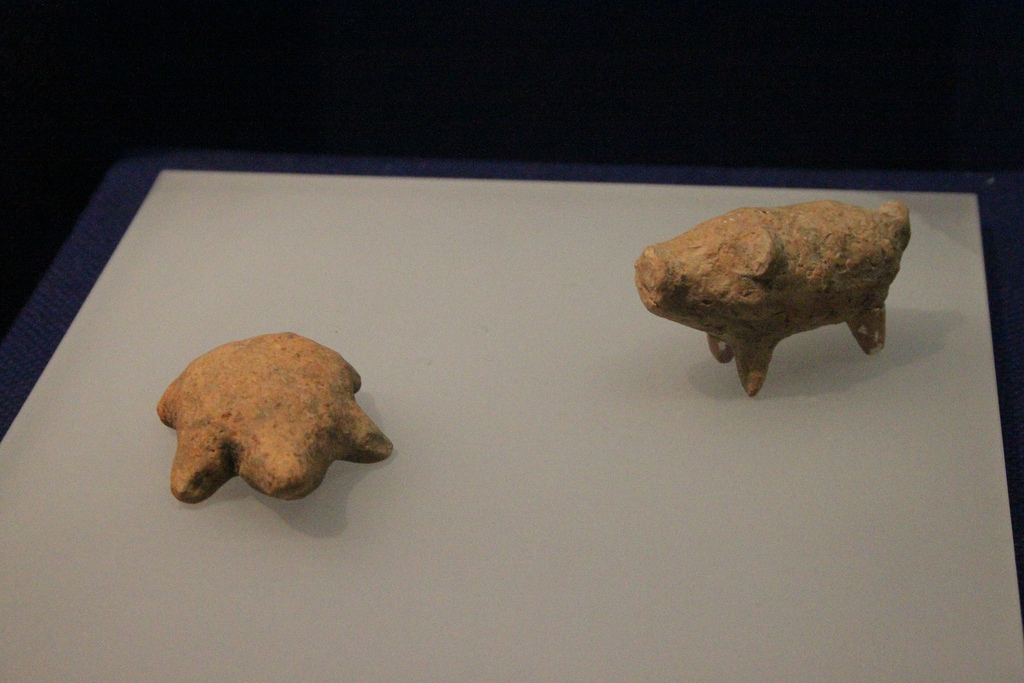
Clay figurines: turtle and pig

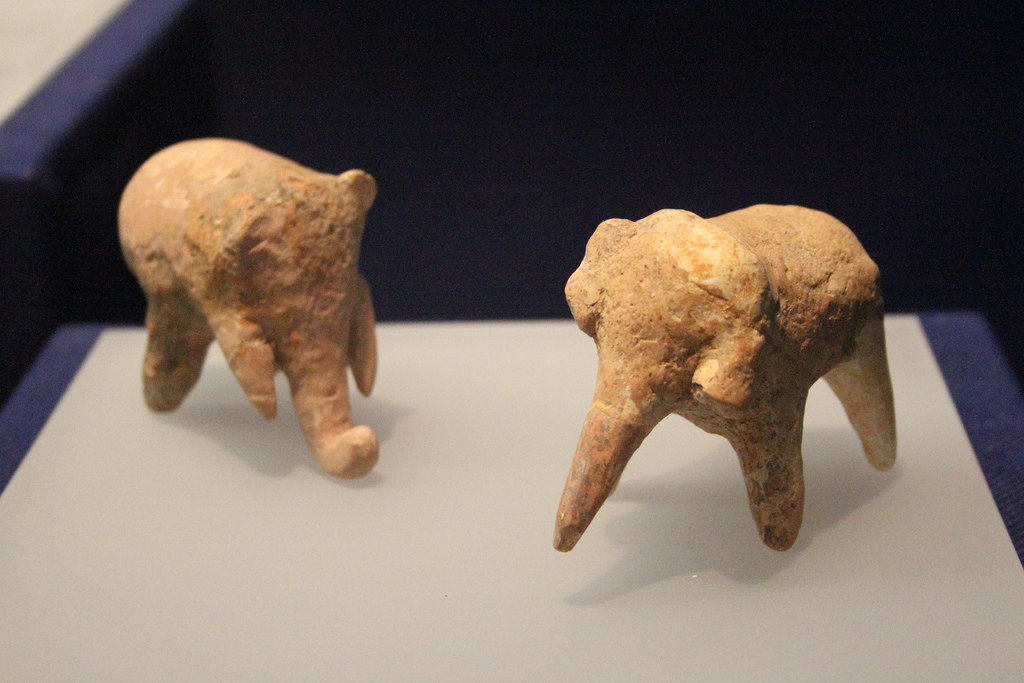
Clay elephant figurines, H. 6.8 cm

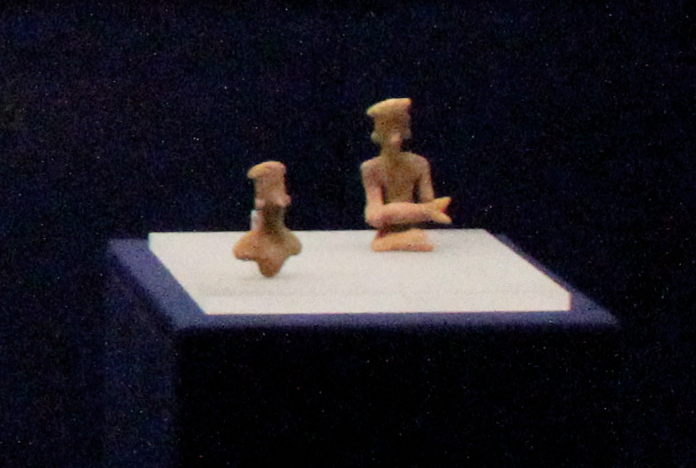
Clay human figurines, one holding a fish, H. 9.5 cm

== See also ==
- Neolithic Chinese ceramics
- Neolithic China
- Geography of China
- Chinese art
- Prehistory of China
- Three Sovereigns and Five Emperors
- Xia dynasty

== Bibliography ==
- Fahr-Becker, Gabriele (1999), Les Arts de l'Asie orientale [The Arts of East Asia] (in French), vol. 1, Cologne: Könemann, ISBN 3-8290-1743-X.
- Li, Zhiyan; Bower, Virginia L.; He, Li (2010), Chinese Ceramics: From the Paleolithic Period to the Qing Dynasty, New Haven: Yale University Press, ISBN 978-0-300-11278-8.
- Liu, Li; Chen, Xingcan (2012), The Archaeology of China: From the Late Paleolithic to the Early Bronze Age, Cambridge University Press, ISBN 978-0-521-64310-8.
- Steinhardt, Nancy Shatzman (2005), L'architecture chinoise [Chinese Architecture] (in French), Arles: Philippe Picquier, ISBN 2-87730-789-1.
- Zhang, Chi (2013), "The Qujialing–Shijiahe culture in the middle Yangzi River valley", in Underhill, Anne P. (ed.), A Companion to Chinese Archaeology, John Wiley & Sons, pp. 510–534, ISBN 978-1-118-32578-0.
- Zhang, Chi; Hung, Hsiao-chun (2008), "The Neolithic of Southern China-Origin, Development, and Dispersal", Asian Perspectives, 47 (2): 299–329, doi:10.1353/asi.0.0004, hdl:10125/17291, S2CID 162258899.
