= Chengtoushan =

Archaeological site in Hunan, China

Coordinates: 29°41′30″N 111°39′20″E

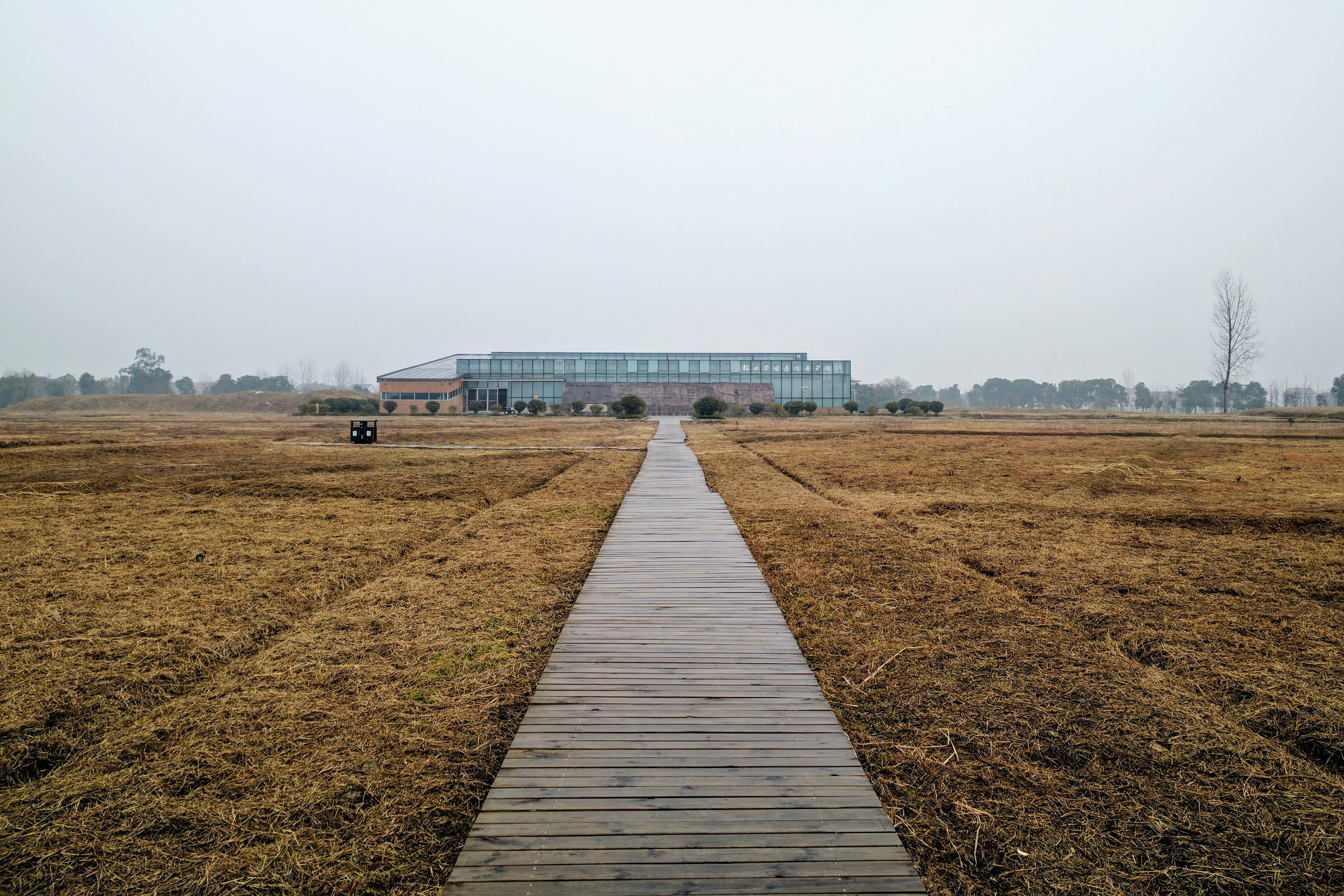
Entrance of the Chengtoushan ruins

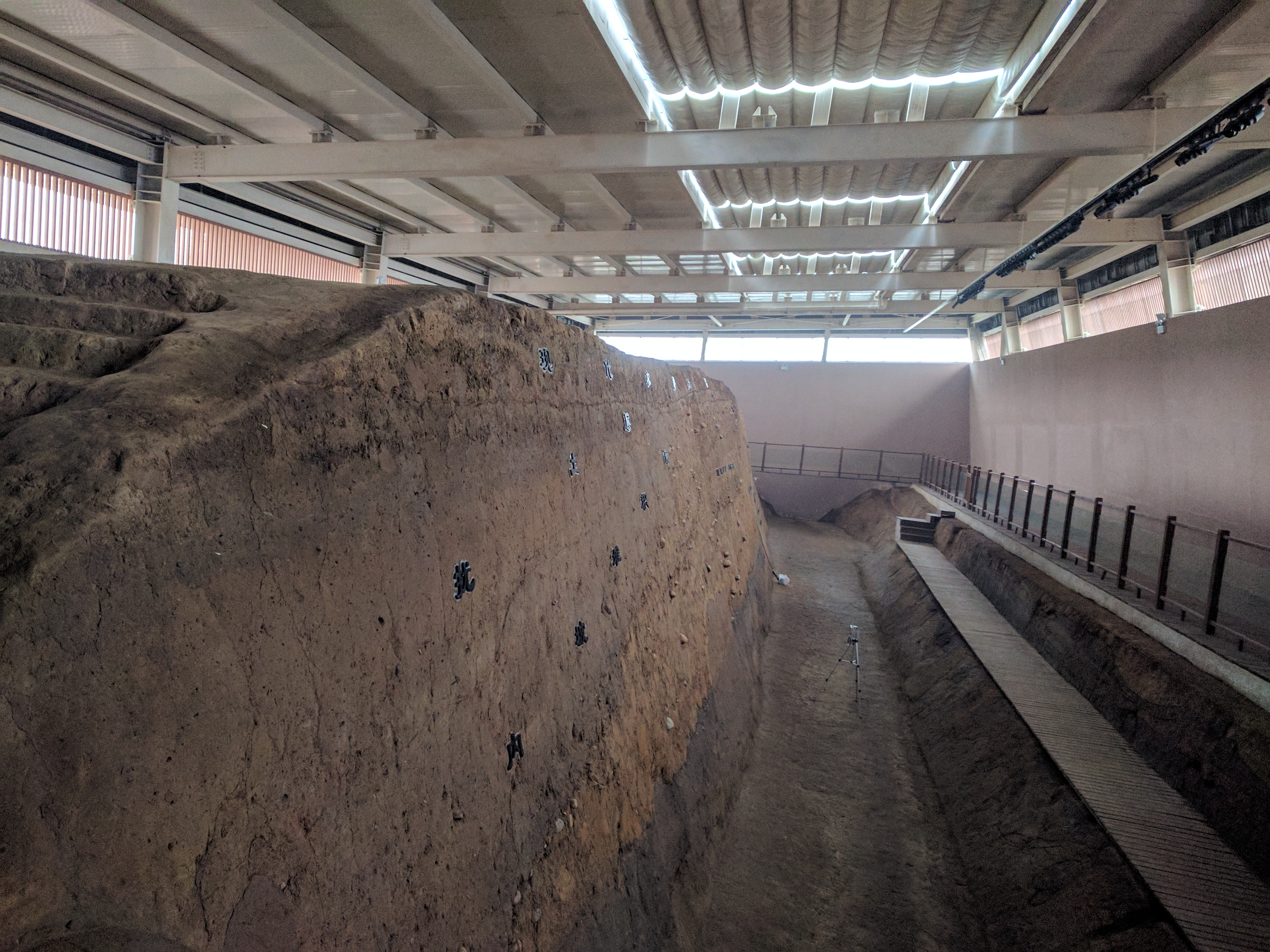
The ancient wall at Chengtoushan

Chengtoushan (simplified Chinese: 城头山; traditional Chinese: 城頭山; pinyin: Chéngtóushān) was a Neolithic settlement located on the northwestern edge of Dongting Lake in Li County, Hunan, China.

The site is at the village of Chengtoushan, Chengtoushan Town, Li County, it is about 12 kilometres (7 mi) northwest of the county seat and 8 kilometres (5 mi) north of the Li River.

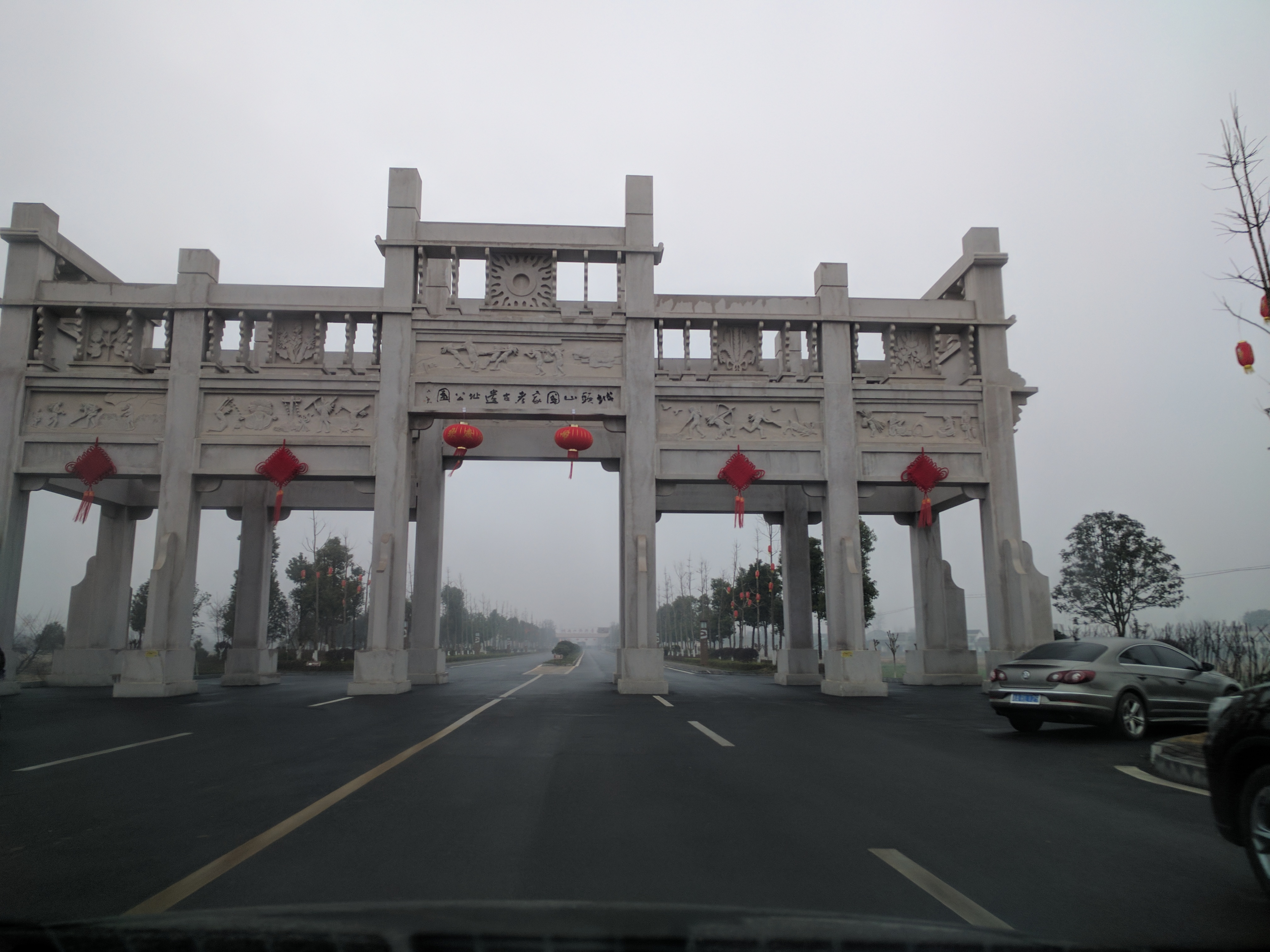
The front gate to Chengtoushan museum

The site contains one of the earliest dated rice paddies in the world (dating from 4500 to 3000 BC). The settlement spanned three separate cultures: the Daxi culture, the Qujialing culture and the Shijiahe culture. The site was abandoned around the middle period of the Shijiahe culture.

Chengtoushan was a round settlement surrounded by a moat and rammed earth wall, which was first built during the Daxi culture. The remains of human sacrifices were discovered under the foundation of the wall. The remains of a gravel road, a river bridge and a river-control gate were also discovered at Chengtoushan. It is possibly one of the oldest walled sites in China, with the walls and moat built around 4000 BC, where it existed for two millennia.

The earliest known examples of fired bricks were discovered at Chengtoushan, dating to around 4400 BC. These bricks were made of red clay, which was obtained by digging into the loess strata. They were fired on all sides to above 600 °C, and used as flooring for houses. By the Qujialing period (3300 BC), fired bricks were being used to pave roads and as building foundations at Chengtoushan.
