= Cennan =

Town in Hunan, China

Cennan 岑南镇
- Town
- Location in Hunan
- Coordinates: 29°45′02″N 111°46′08″E
- Country: People's Republic of China
- Province: Hunan
- Prefecture-level city: Changde
- County: Li County
- Village-level divisions: 1 community, 10 villages
- Time zone: UTC+8 (China Standard)

Cennan (Chinese: 涔南镇; pinyin: Cénnán Zhèn) is a town of Li County in Hunan, China. It has an area of 89.87 km^{2} (34.70 sq mi) with a population of 39,800 (as of 2017). The town has 10 villages and a community under its jurisdiction, and its seat is Zengjiahe Community (Chinese: 曾家河社区).

== History ==
The township of Cennan was formed in 1928. It was reorganized as a commune in 1958 and a township in 1984. It was reorganized to as a town through the amalgamation of the former township of Cennan (Chinese: 涔南乡), 8 villages of Lidong Township (Chinese: 澧东乡) and the Cengnan Flood Storage Area (Chinese: 涔澹蓄洪区) on November 23, 2015. Minyan Village (Chinese: 民堰村) was transferred to Lidan Subdistrict in 2017.

== Subdivisions ==
Through the amalgamation of village-level divisions in 2016, its divisions were reduced to 10 villages and a community from 23 villages and a community. In 2017, Minyan Village (Chinese: 民堰村) was transferred to Lidan Subdistrict. The town of Cenan has 10 villages and a communities under its jurisdiction.

a community

- Zengjiahe Community (Chinese: 曾家河社区)

10 villages

- Beiminhu Village (Chinese: 北民湖村)
- Cuijiaqang Village (Chinese: 崔家岗村)
- Dongtianyan Village (Chinese: 东田堰村)
- Heimadang Village (Chinese: 黑马垱村)
- Heli Village (Chinese: 合力村)
- Jijiaocheng Village (Chinese: 鸡叫城村)
- Shanghekou Village (Chinese: 上河口村)
- Shuanglin Village (Chinese: 双林村)
- Shuangpu Village (Chinese: 双铺村)
- Tuanjie Village (Chinese: 团结村)
