= Daxi culture =

Neolithic culture in the Three Gorges region

- Geographical range: middle Yangtze
- Period: Neolithic
- Dates: c. 5000 – c. 3300 BC
- Followed by: Qujialing culture

Chinese name
- Chinese: 大溪文化
Transcriptions
Standard Mandarin
- Hanyu Pinyin: Dàxī wénhuà

The Daxi culture (5000–3300 BC) was a Neolithic culture centered in the Three Gorges region around the middle Yangtze, China. The culture ranged from western Hubei to eastern Sichuan and the Pearl River Delta. The site at Daxi, located in the Qutang Gorge around Wushan, Chongqing, was discovered by Nels C. Nelson in the 1920s.

== Material culture ==
Daxi sites are typified by the presence of dou (cylindrical bottles), white pan (plates), and red pottery. The Daxi people cultivated rice extensively. Daxi sites were some of the earliest in China to show evidence of moats and walled settlements.

The Daxi culture showed evidence of cultural interactions with the Yangtze River Delta region. The white pan artefacts from the culture were discovered at several Yangtze River Delta sites, including the type site of the Majiabang culture. Conversely, jade artefacts at Daxi sites show possible influence from the Yangtze River Delta region. The Daxi culture was followed by the Qujialing culture.

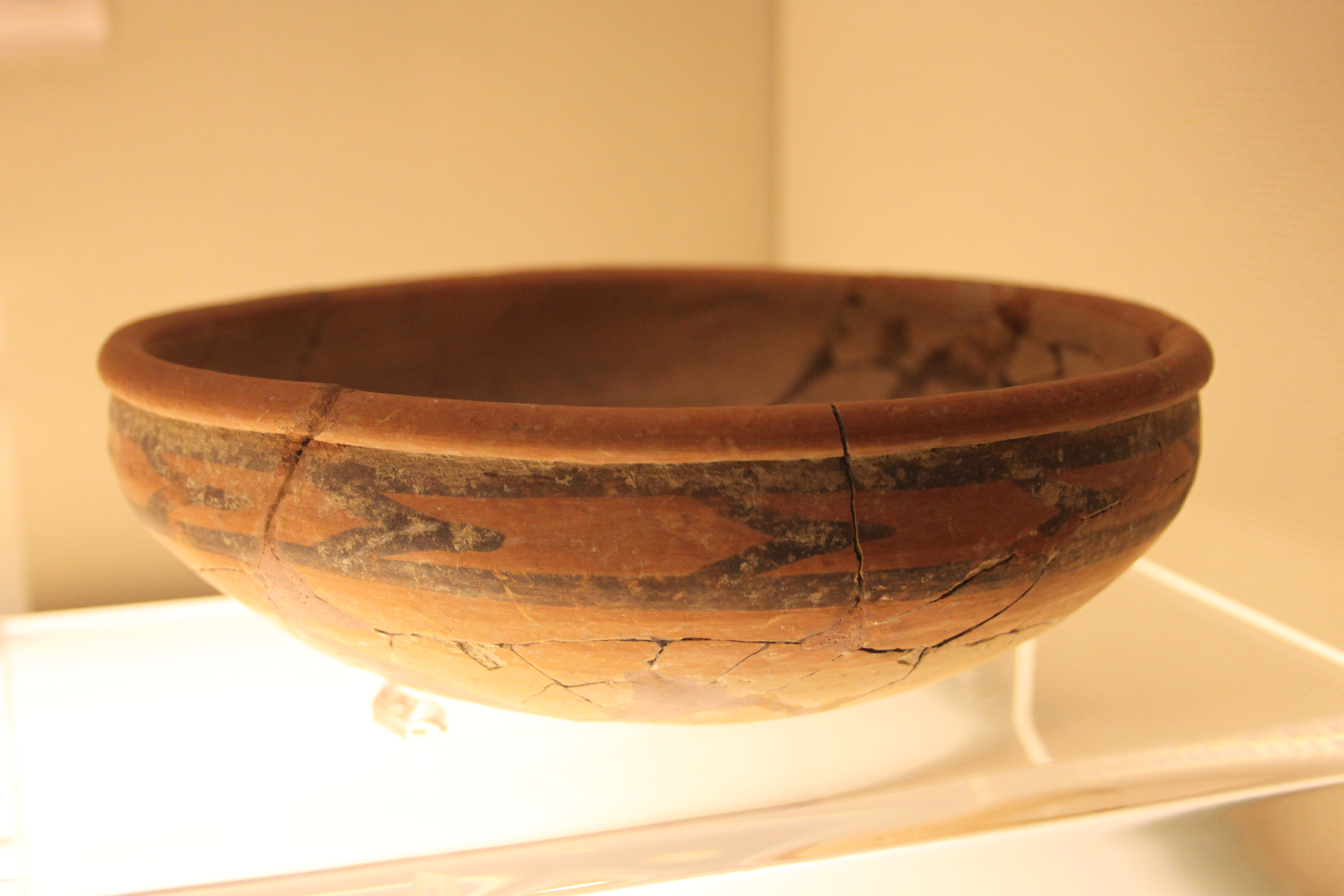
Daxi culture bowl

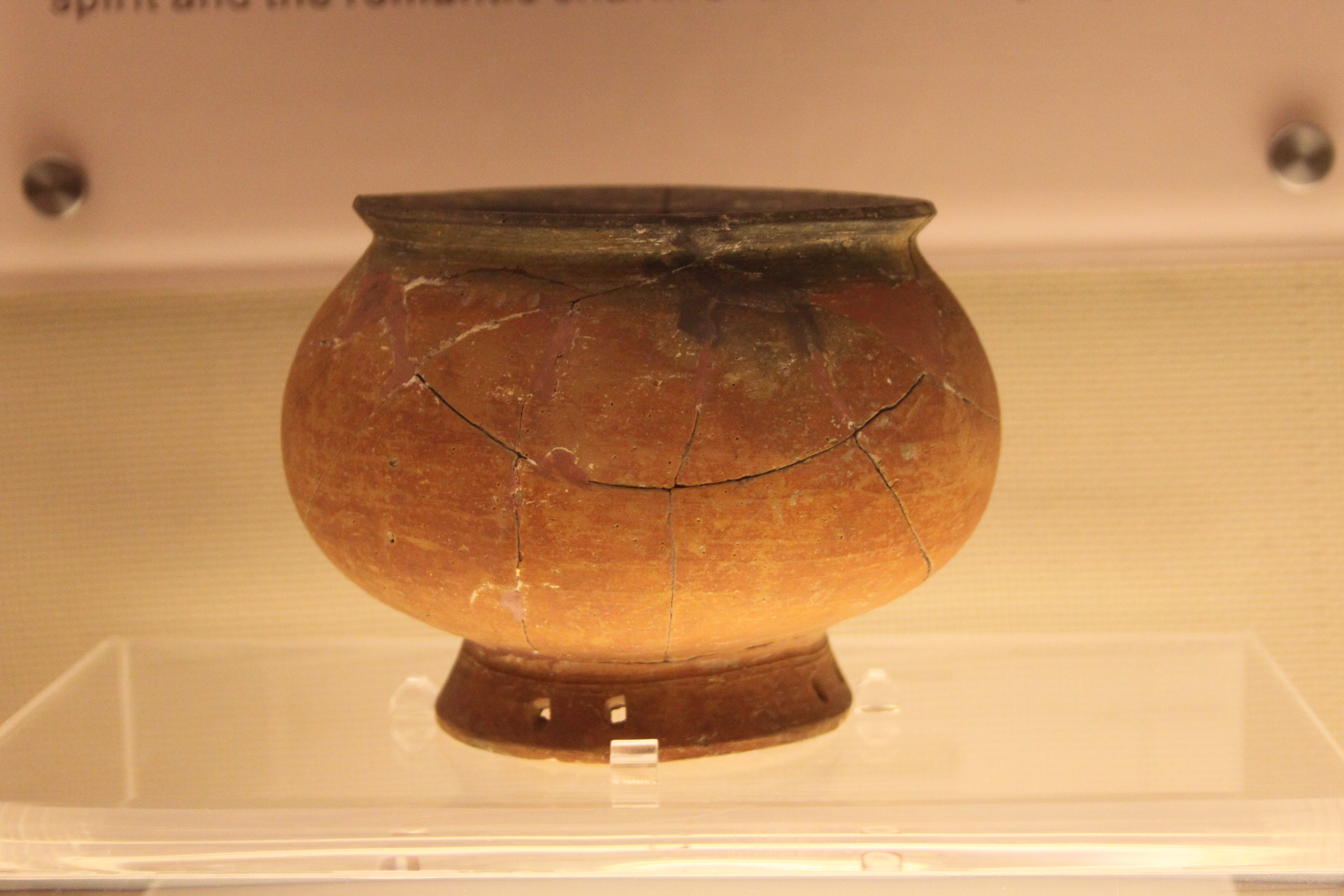
Daxi culture Gui

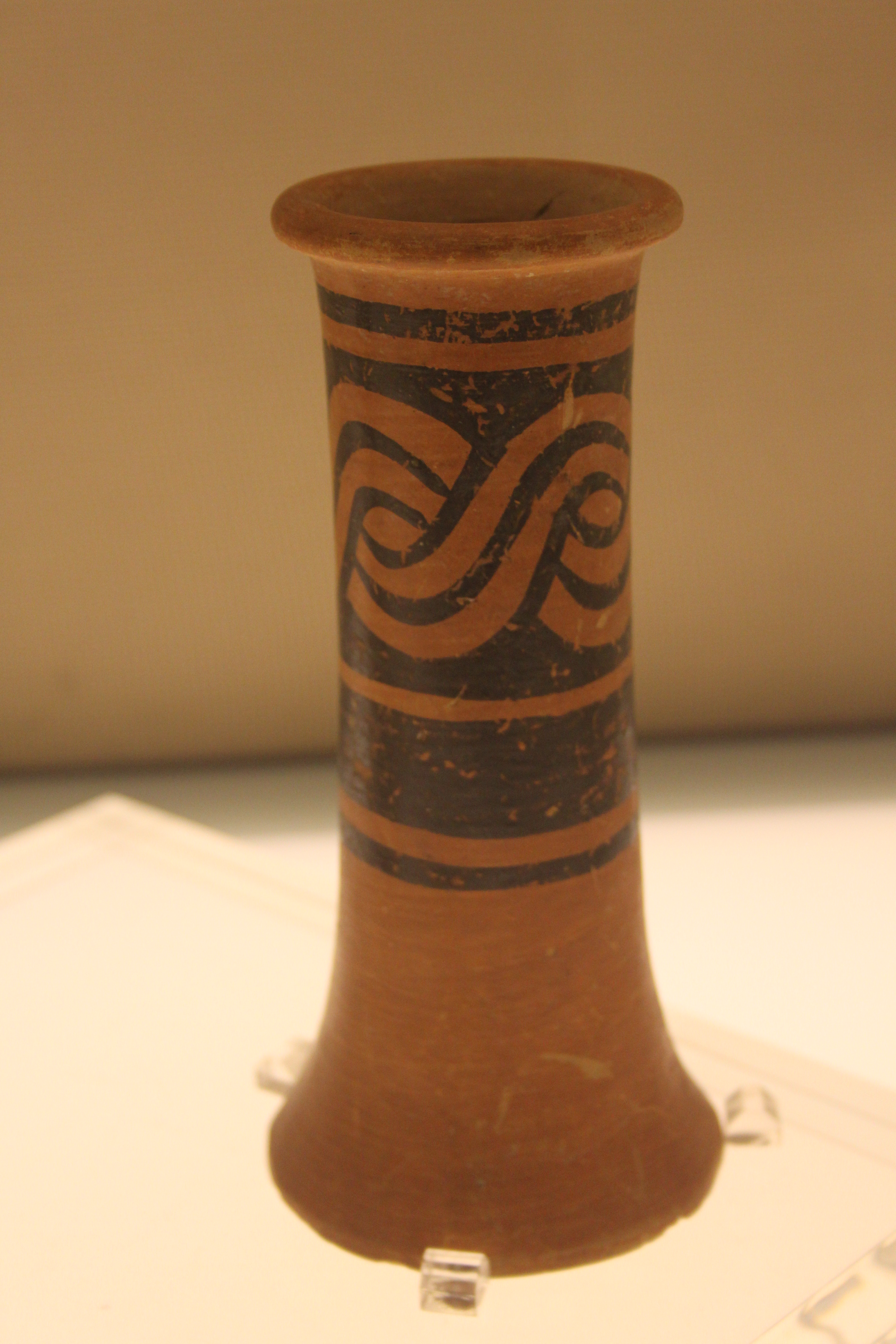
Daxi culture bottle

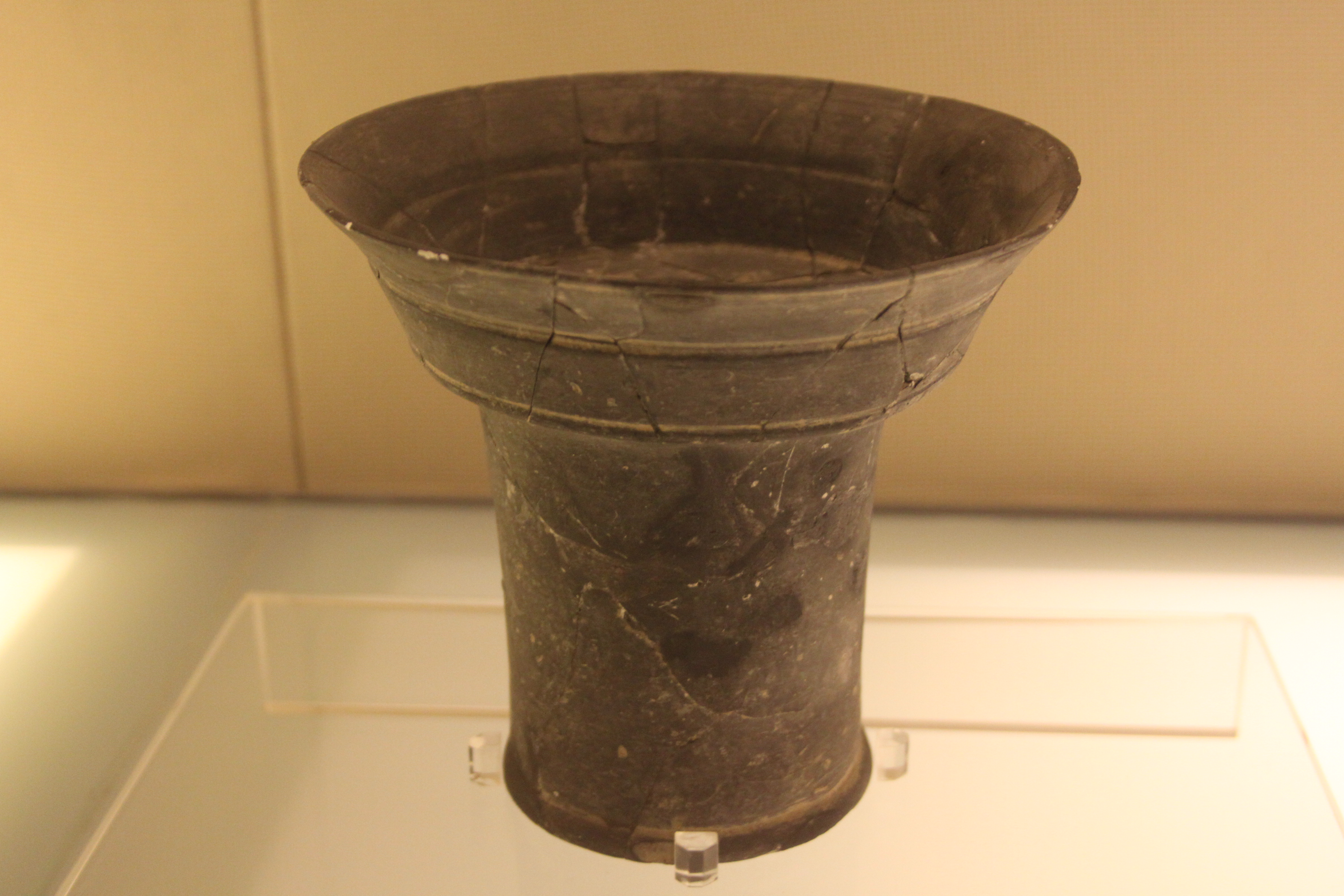
Daxi culture black cup

== People of Daxi ==
Daxi culture and contemporary cultures and polities c. 5000 BC

Remains at Daxi were found to possess a high frequency of the Y-chromosome haplogroup O3d-M7 (also referred to as O-M7), which was not found at other prehistoric sites in China. Huang et al. (2022) found that the most common Y-chromosome haplogroup among many Hmongic-speaking ethnic groups (including Guangxi Miao, Hunan Miao, Hunan Pa-Hng, and Thailand Hmong) is O2a2a2a1a2a1a2-N5 (a subclade of O-M7), with a frequency of 47.1% among the Guangxi Miao. This might indicate that the people of Daxi were the ancestors of Hmong–Mien speakers, who subsequently migrated to the southwest.

== See also ==
- List of Neolithic cultures of China
- Chengtoushan
- Pengtoushan culture
- Shijiahe culture
