= Bashidang =

Archaeological site in Hunan, China

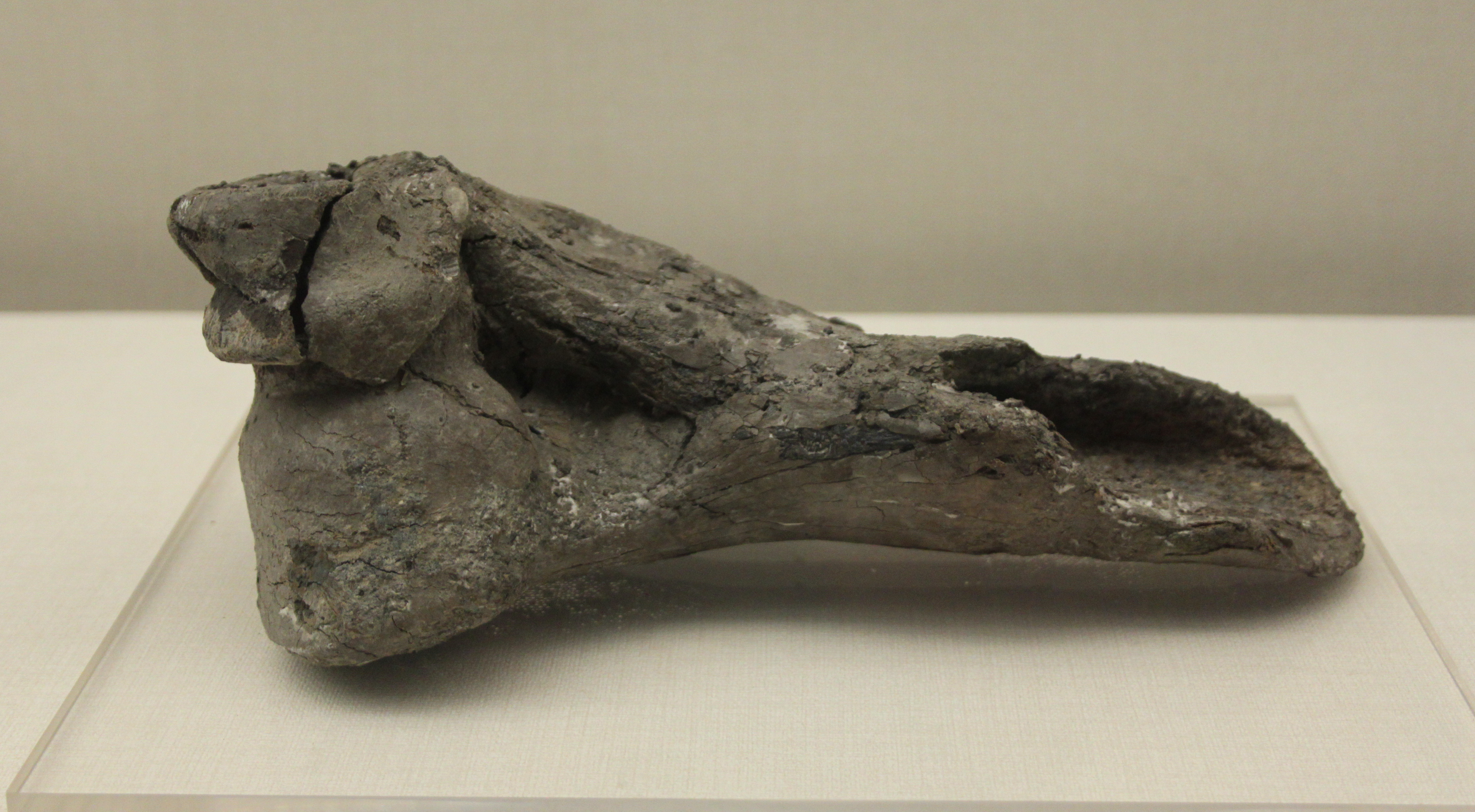
Bone spade. Bashidang site.

Bashidang (simplified Chinese: 八十垱; traditional Chinese: 八十壋; pinyin: Bāshídàng) was the site of a Neolithic Yangtze River settlement in Lixian County, Hunan, China. Bashidang is considered to be a very late site of the Pengtoushan culture. The site is the earliest in China to feature both a wall and a ditch; the ditch was the outermost perimeter. A raised, star-shaped platform was found at the center of the settlement, possibly used for ceremonial purposes.

The people at Bashidang cultivated rice, along with water caltrop and Nelumbo nucifera. Over 15,000 grains of rice were found at Bashidang, the largest find discovered in a Neolithic site in China. The size of the rice was close to the size of modern domesticated rice. Several different types of cultivated rice were found at Bashidang.

So far, Bashidang is the only site in southern China from the Neolithic to the Bronze Age to yield evidence of soybean seeds.
