= Liyang Subdistrict, Li County =

Subdistrict of Li County, Hunan, China

Coordinates: 29°39′18″N 111°45′3″E

Liyang Subdistrict (Chinese: 澧阳街道; pinyin: Lǐyáng Jiēdào) is a subdistrict and the county seat of Li County in Hunan, China. The subdistrict was the former Chengguan Town (Chinese: 城关镇) established in 1950. It was reorganized as a subdistrict in 2013. It has an area of 20.47 km^{2} (7.90 sq mi) with a population of 149,000 (as of 2017). It has 18 communities under its jurisdiction.
