= Chengtoushan Town =

Chengtoushan Town 城头山镇
- Town
- Location in Hunan
- Coordinates: 29°41′56″N 111°38′46″E
- Country: People's Republic of China
- Province: Hunan
- Prefecture-level city: Changde
- County: Li
- Time zone: UTC+8 (China Standard)
- Website: http://www.li-xian.gov.cn/zwz19/Index.asp

Chengtoushan Town (simplified Chinese: 城头山镇; traditional Chinese: 城頭山鎮; pinyin: Chéngtóushān Zhèn) is a town in Li County, Hunan Province, China. It was reformed on November 23, 2015. The town has an area of 101.61 kilometres (63.14 mi), and as of 2015, it has a census registered population of 69,500. Chengtoushan Town is divided into 16 villages and 3 communities under its jurisdiction, and the seat of the town is Zhoujiapo (周家坡社区).

The town is named after the known National Historical and Cultural Site of Chengtoushan. Located on the southwestern corner of the county, Chengtoushan Town is immediately adjacent to the east central margin of Linli County. It is about 6 kilometres (4 mi) north of the Li River, 11 kilometres (7 mi) west of the county seat, 70 kilometres (43 mi) north of the city proper of Changde City and 200 kilometres (124 mi) northwest of Changsha City.
