= Lidan Subdistrict =

Subdistrict in Li County, Hunan, China

Coordinates: 29°38′14″N 111°46′16″E

Lidan Subdistrict (Chinese: 澧澹街道; pinyin: Lǐdàn Jiēdào) is a subdistrict of Li County in Hunan, China. The subdistrict is the former Lidan Township (Chinese: 澧澹乡) reorganized as a subdistrict in 2013. It has an area of 50.57 km^{2} (19.53 sq mi) with a population of 39,600 (as of 2017). The subdistrict has 4 villages and 12 communities under its jurisdiction, and its seat is Dengjiatan Village (Chinese: 邓家滩村).

== History ==
The subdistrict of Lidan is originally the former Lidan Township. the former Lidong Township (Chinese: 澧东乡) ceased to be a separate township in 2015, 6 villages of which were merged to it. Minyan Village (Chinese: 民堰村) of Cennan Town was transferred to it in 2017.

== Subdivisions ==
The subdistrict of Lidan had 12 communities and 6 villages at its establishment in 2015. Through the amalgamation of villages in 2016, its villages were reduced to 3.In 2017, Minyan Village (Chinese: 民堰村) of Cennan Town was transferred to it in 2017. The subdistrict of Lidan has 4 villages and 12 communities under its jurisdiction.

4 villages

- Caikoutan Village (Chinese: 蔡口滩村), established at merging two villages of Changqing (Chinese: 长庆村) and Chejiaxi (Chinese: 车家溪村) in 2016.
- Dengjiatan Village (Chinese: 邓家滩村)
- Lidong Village (Chinese: 澧东村)
- Minyan Village (Chinese: 民堰村)

12 communities

- Baiyanghu Community (Chinese: 白羊湖社区)
- Caijin Community (Chinese: 蔡津社区)
- Daxiangkou Community (Chinese: 大巷口社区)
- Dongzhou Community (Chinese: 东洲社区)
- Jiati Community (Chinese: 夹堤社区)
- Renhe Community (Chinese: 仁和社区)
- Sanjia Community (Chinese: 三甲社区)
- Shangfu Community (Chinese: 上福社区)
- Yonggu Community (Chinese: 永固社区)
- Yongxian Community (Chinese: 拥宪社区)
- Yuhuang Community (Chinese: 玉皇社区)
- Zhangliu Community (Chinese: 樟柳社区)
