= Qujialing culture =

Chinese Neolithic civilization

- Geographical range: middle Yangtze
- Period: Neolithic
- Dates: c. 3400 – c. 2500 BC
- Preceded by: Daxi culture
- Followed by: Shijiahe culture

Chinese name
- Chinese: 屈家嶺文化
Transcriptions
Standard Mandarin
- Hanyu Pinyin: Qūjiālǐng wénhuà

The Qujialing culture (3400–2500 BC) was a Neolithic civilization centered primarily on the middle Yangtze River region in Hubei and Hunan, China. Named after its type site in Jingshan County, Hubei, it succeeded the Daxi culture (5000–3300 BC) and reached southern Shaanxi, northern Jiangxi, and southwest Henan. The culture represents a significant development in Neolithic society, characterized by large-scale fortified settlements, advanced agriculture, and specialized craftsmanship. Artefact types unique to the culture include ceramic balls and painted spindle whorls, the latter inherited by the succeeding Shijiahe culture.

== Location, dating, discovery history, and environmental context ==
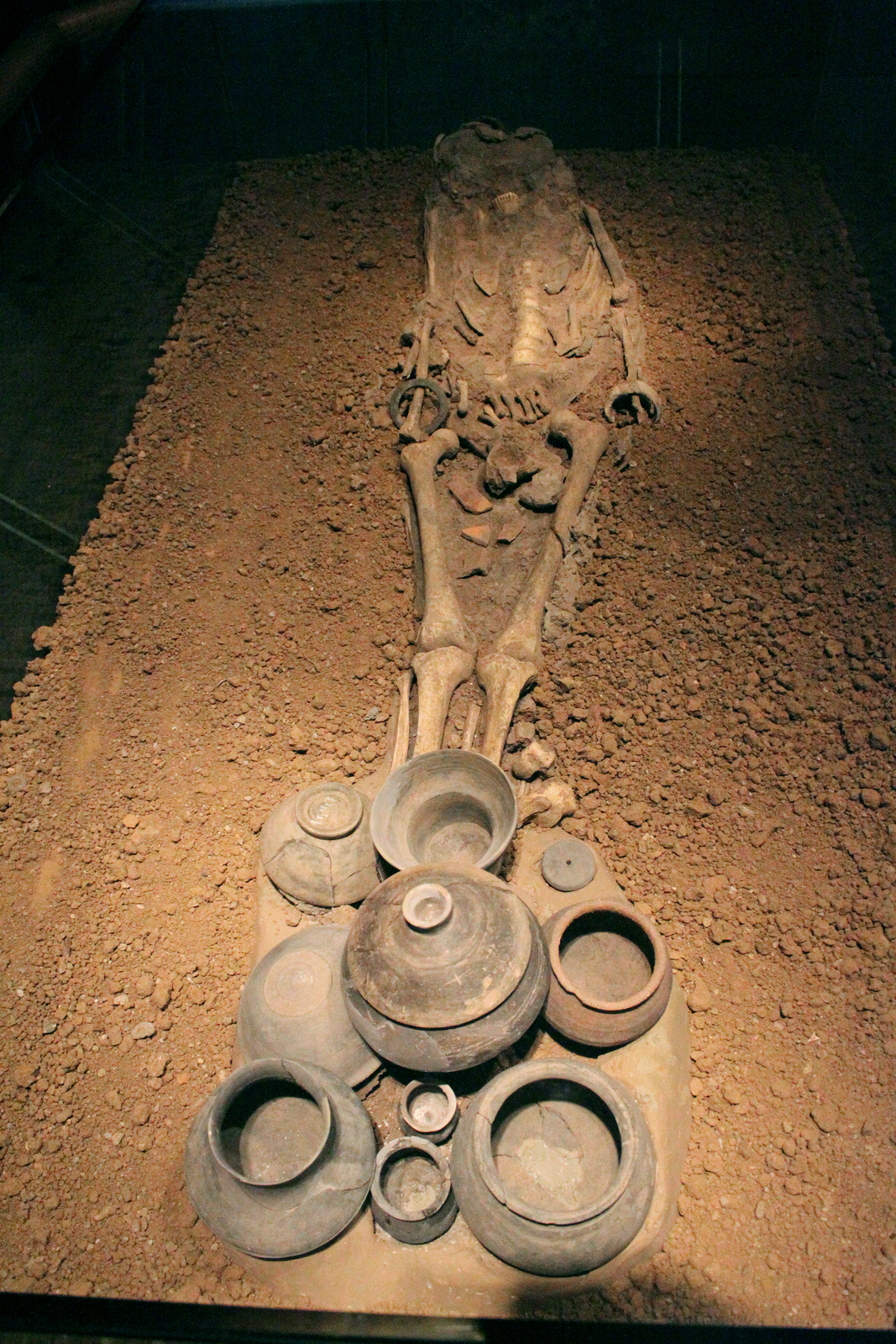
Skeleton and burial vessels

The Qujialing site, located in the Jianghan Plain of Hubei, was first identified in the 1950s, with initial excavations conducted from 1955 to 1957. The culture's timeline spans approximately 3400–2500 BC, with some scholars suggesting that earlier evidence (3400–3000 BC) may belong to the final phase of the Daxi culture. Geographically, it thrived in the middle Yangtze region, bordered by the Dabie Mountains to the west, Dongting Lake to the north, the Three Gorges to the east, and the Nanyang Basin to the south. Most sites are located north of the Yangtze between modern Yichang and Wuhan, with some extending southwest to the southern bank of the river. These lowland sites, situated on slightly elevated terrain amidst plains and low hills, were ideal for agriculture and facilitated trade via the Yangtze.

The region was historically dominated by wetlands, rivers, lakes, and marshes, with settlements built on raised ground to avoid flooding. Archaeological evidence from the shores of Dongting Lake, recently embanked for farmland, reveals stilted structures from the Pengtoushan culture and Daxi culture, indicating a subtropical environment with deciduous and evergreen forests. Algae remains suggest periodic flooding. The climate was warm and humid during the culture's early phases but became drier, transitioning to grasslands and scrub, which coincided with reduced human activity.

== Subsistence ==
Agriculture in the region has deep roots, with evidence of rice cultivation dating back to the Daxi culture. Early rice farming relied on drainage systems, but by the third millennium BC, irrigated rice paddies emerged, as seen at the Chengtoushan site with its reservoirs. The Qujialing culture cultivated Oryza sativa (Asian rice), Setaria italica (foxtail millet), and Panicum miliaceum (common millet), alongside vegetables, amaranths, and plants now considered weeds.

== Emergence of fortified settlements ==
The Qujialing culture marked a significant population increase, with the establishment of large, often circular, fortified settlements, some reaching 263 ha compared to the Daxi culture's largest site, Chengtoushan (6–8 ha). These fortifications, likely serving defensive purposes, reflect the rise of early states and inter-city rivalries. The Qujialing site features a central urban area of 70 ha enclosed by a moat 25–30 m wide and 3 m deep, surrounded by ten residential zones and additional dwellings beyond the moat. Originating as a small Daxi-era village, it grew into a fortified agglomeration by the late Qujialing phase. City walls, man-made water systems, large courtyard buildings, and residential sites were also found, indicating advanced urban planning.

== Craftsmanship, funerary practices, and symbolism ==
Qujialing ceramics, building on Daxi traditions, incorporated Yangshao and Dawenkou influences, introducing wheel-thrown vessels like bowls (wan), plates (dou), and jars (guan), reflecting increased productivity by specialized potters. Funerary urns were common, accompanied by diverse vessels like cups (bei), with some tombs containing up to 20 pots or red and yellow lacquered wares. Early copper objects, the southernmost found in Neolithic China, appeared at Dengjiawan. The remains of chickens, dogs, pigs, sheep, and fish were discovered in ten storage pits, alongside eggshell pottery, tripods, ceramic balls, and painted spindle whorls, showcasing the culture's diverse craftsmanship.

== Decline ==
By 2000 BC, fortifications were no longer maintained, and the population declined significantly, unlike the abrupt collapse of the Liangzhu culture. Some sites show traces of the Longshan culture from the Central Plain.

== Characteristic artifacts ==
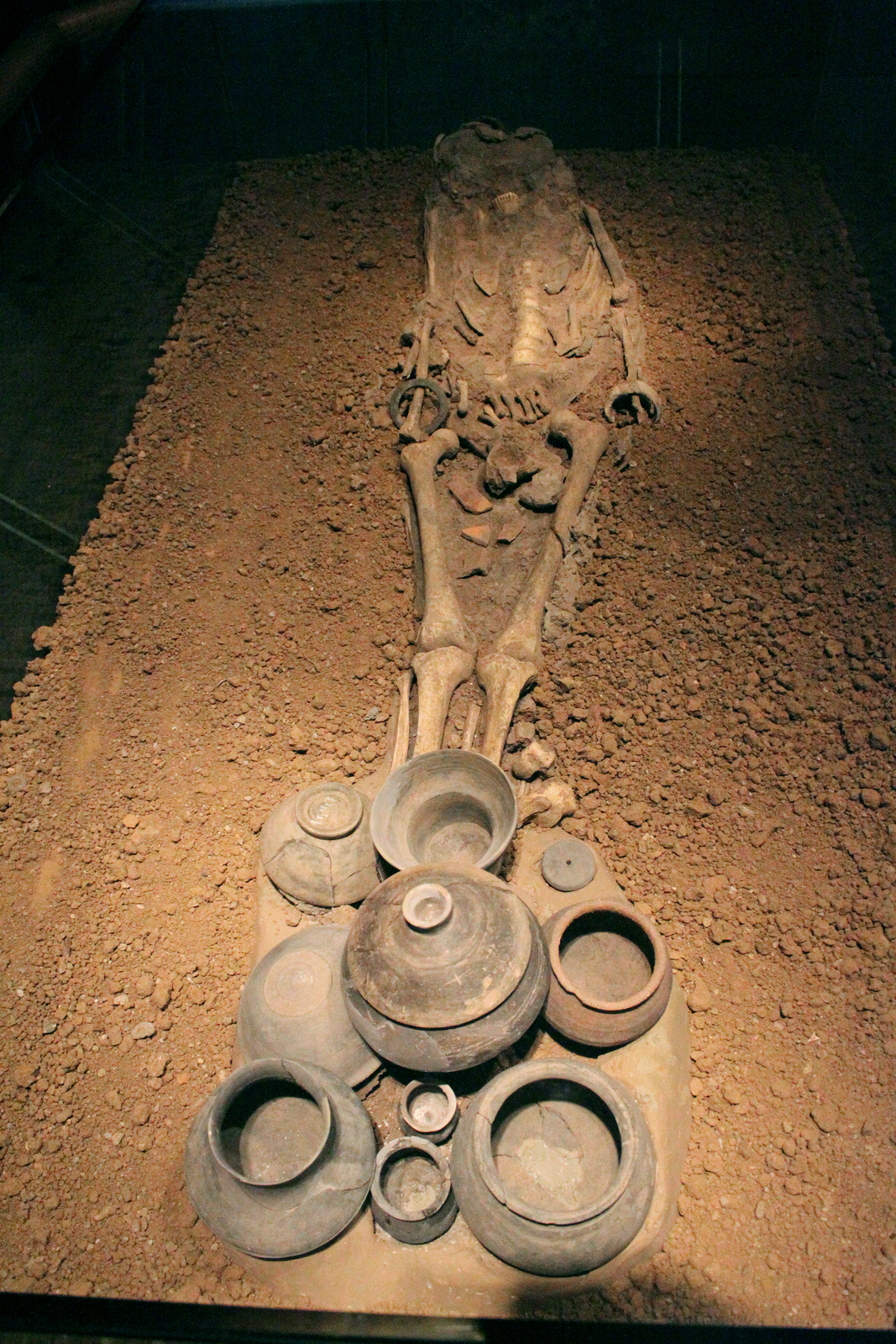
Burial with funerary pottery, Luoshishan, Huanggang

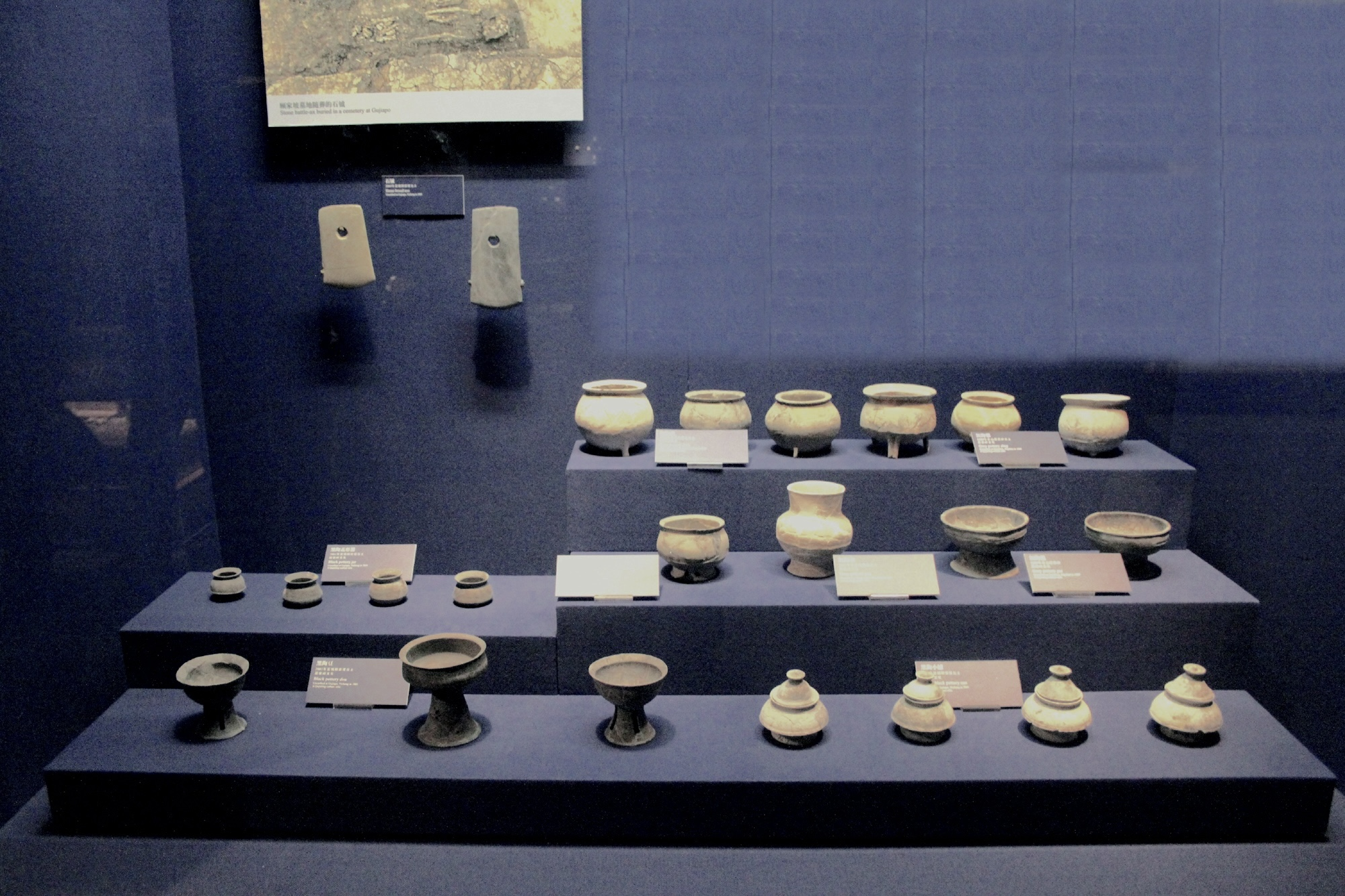
Black pottery and polished stone axes, Qujiapo cemetery

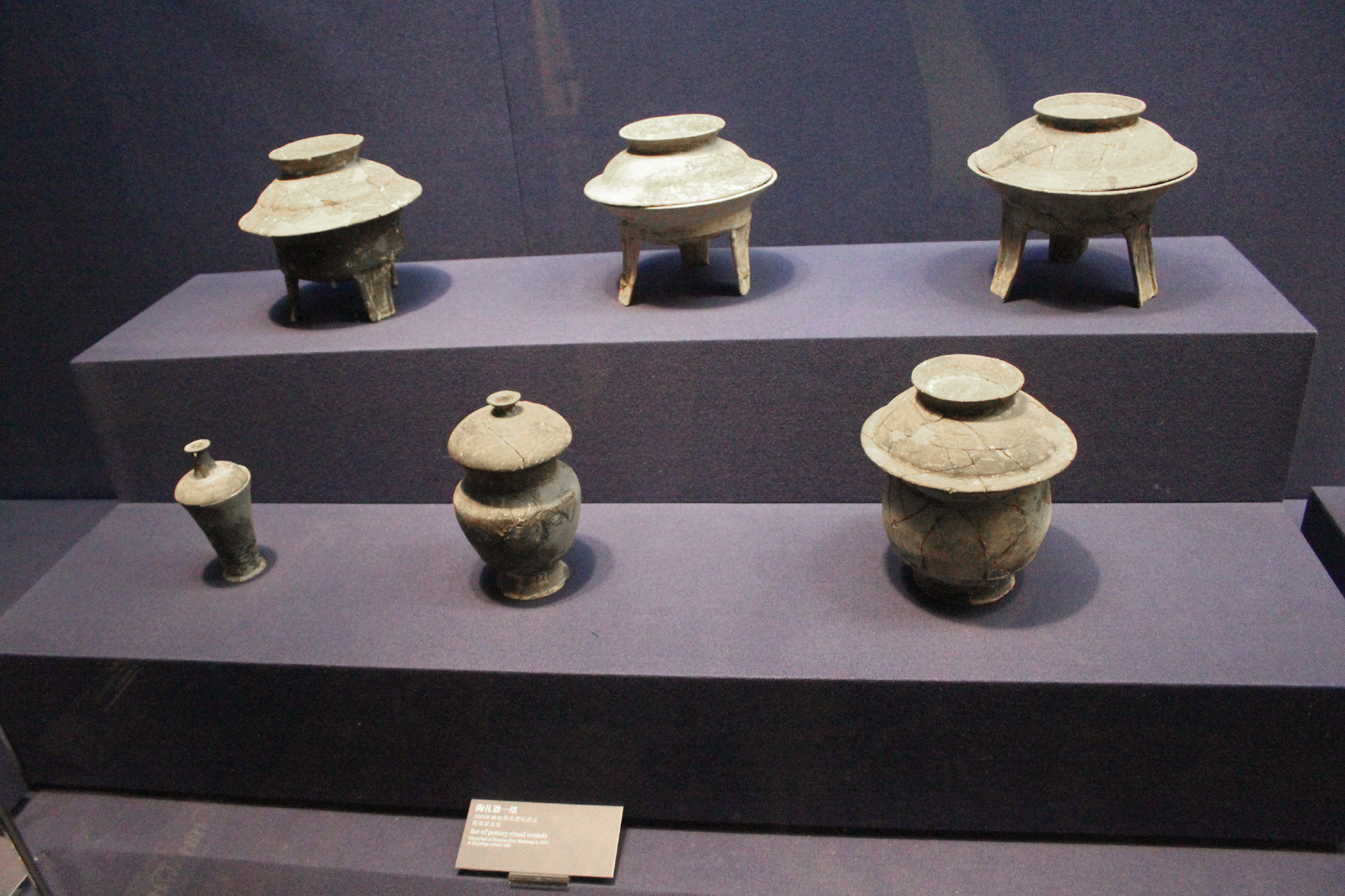
Ceramic funerary vessels

== See also ==
Qujialing culture and other contemporary cultures c. 3000 BC
- Neolithic Chinese ceramics
- Neolithic China
- Geography of China
- Chinese art
- Prehistory of China

== Bibliography ==
- Li, Zhiyan; Bower, Virginia L.; He, Li (2010), Chinese Ceramics: From the Paleolithic Period to the Qing Dynasty, New Haven: Yale University Press, ISBN 978-0-300-11278-8.
- Liu, Li; Chen, Xingcan (2012), The Archaeology of China: From the Late Paleolithic to the Early Bronze Age, Cambridge University Press, ISBN 978-0-521-64310-8.
- Zhang, Chi (2013), "The Qujialing–Shijiahe culture in the middle Yangzi River valley", in Underhill, Anne P. (ed.), A Companion to Chinese Archaeology, John Wiley & Sons, pp. 510–534, ISBN 978-1-118-32578-0.
