= Pengtoushan culture =

Neolithic culture in modern Hunan, China

- Geographical range: China
- Period: Neolithic China
- Dates: 7500–6100 BC
- Type site: Pengtoushan
- Major sites: Bashidang
- Followed by: Lower Zaoshi culture Chengbeixi culture

Chinese name
- Traditional Chinese: 彭頭山文化
- Simplified Chinese: 彭头山文化
Transcriptions
Standard Mandarin
- Hanyu Pinyin: Péngtóushān wénhuà

The Pengtoushan culture was a Neolithic culture located around the central Yangtze River region in northwestern Hunan province, China. It dates to around 7500–6100 BC, and was roughly contemporaneous with the Peiligang culture to the north. It is named after the type site at Pengtoushan.

== Sites ==
Pengtoushan, located in Li County, Hunan, is the type site for the Pengtoushan culture. Excavated in 1988, Pengtoushan has been difficult to date accurately, with a large variability in dates ranging from 9000 BC to 5500 BC. Cord-marked pottery was discovered among the burial goods.

Another important site is Bashidang, also in Li County, belonging to the late stage of the Pengtoushan culture. It features a wall and a ditch, as well as a star-shaped platform.

== Rice cultivation ==
Rice residues at Pengtoushan have been carbon dated to 8200–7800 BC, showing that rice had been domesticated by this time. At later stages, pots containing grains of rice were also dated to approximately 5800 BC. By 4000 BC, evidence of rice domestication in the region is abundant in the form of bone and wooden spades, as well as pottery. The rice grains at Pengtoushan are larger than naturally occurring wild rice. Large amounts of rice grains have also been found at Bashidang.

== Gallery ==
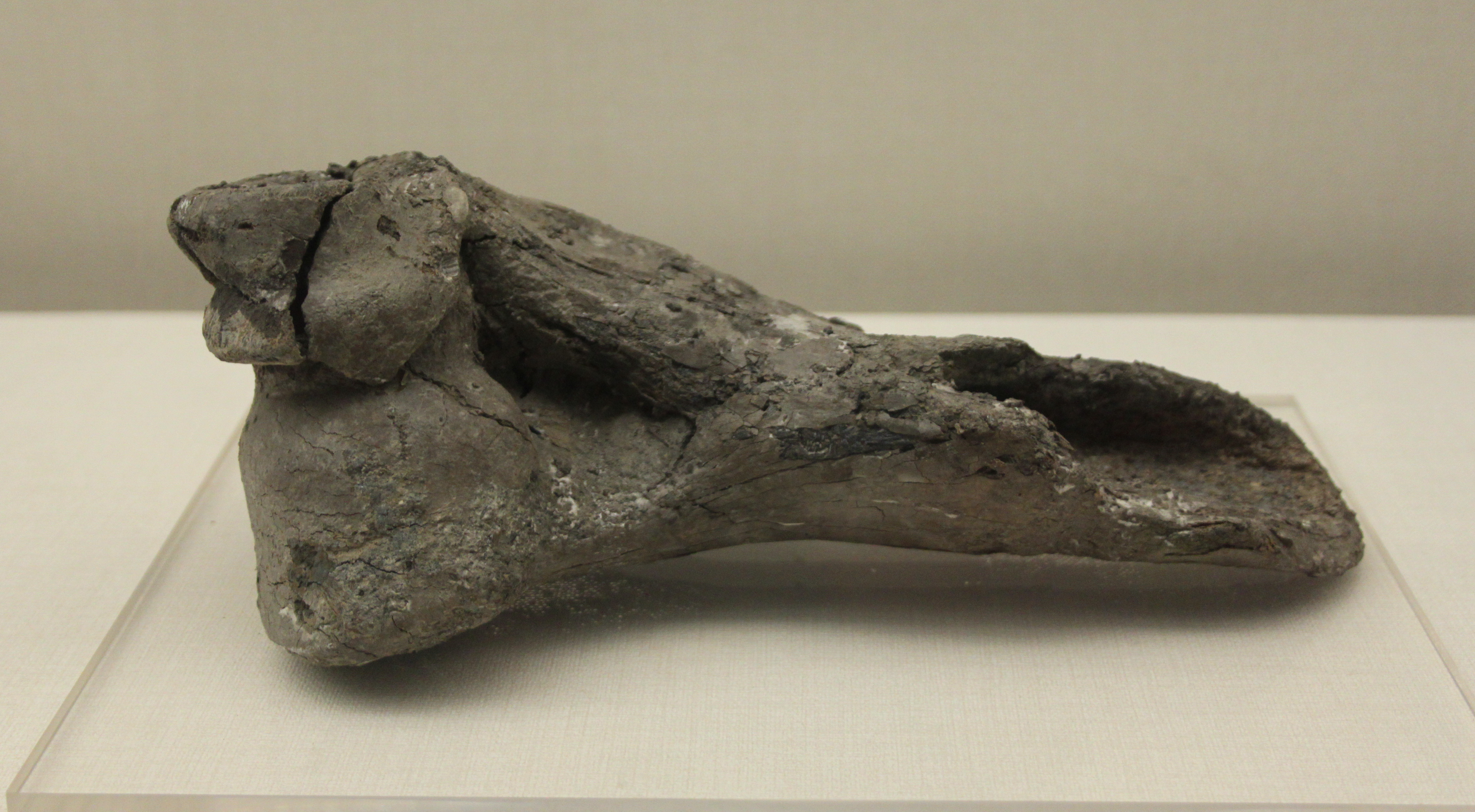
Remains of a bone spade from the Bashidang site

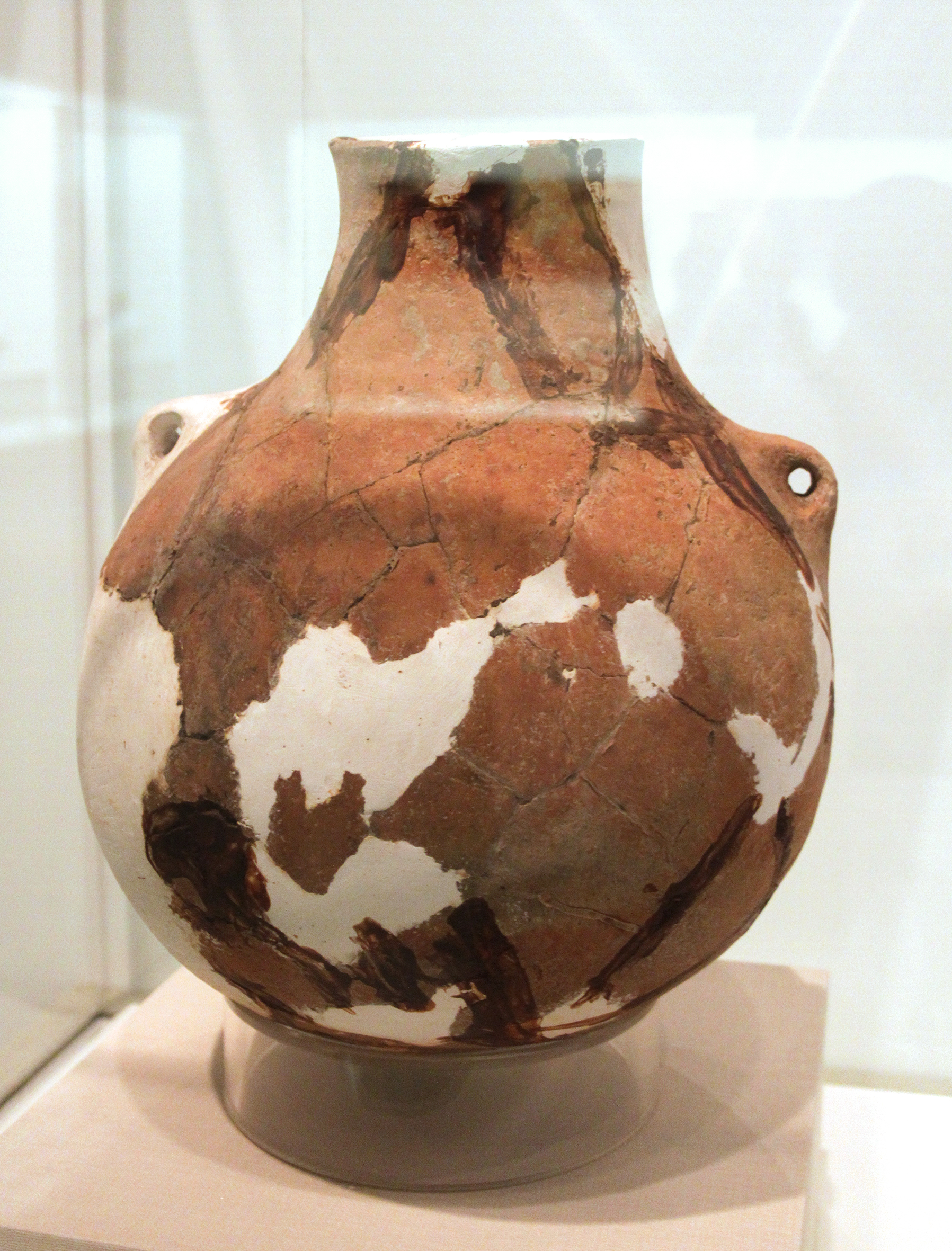
Reconstructed vessel

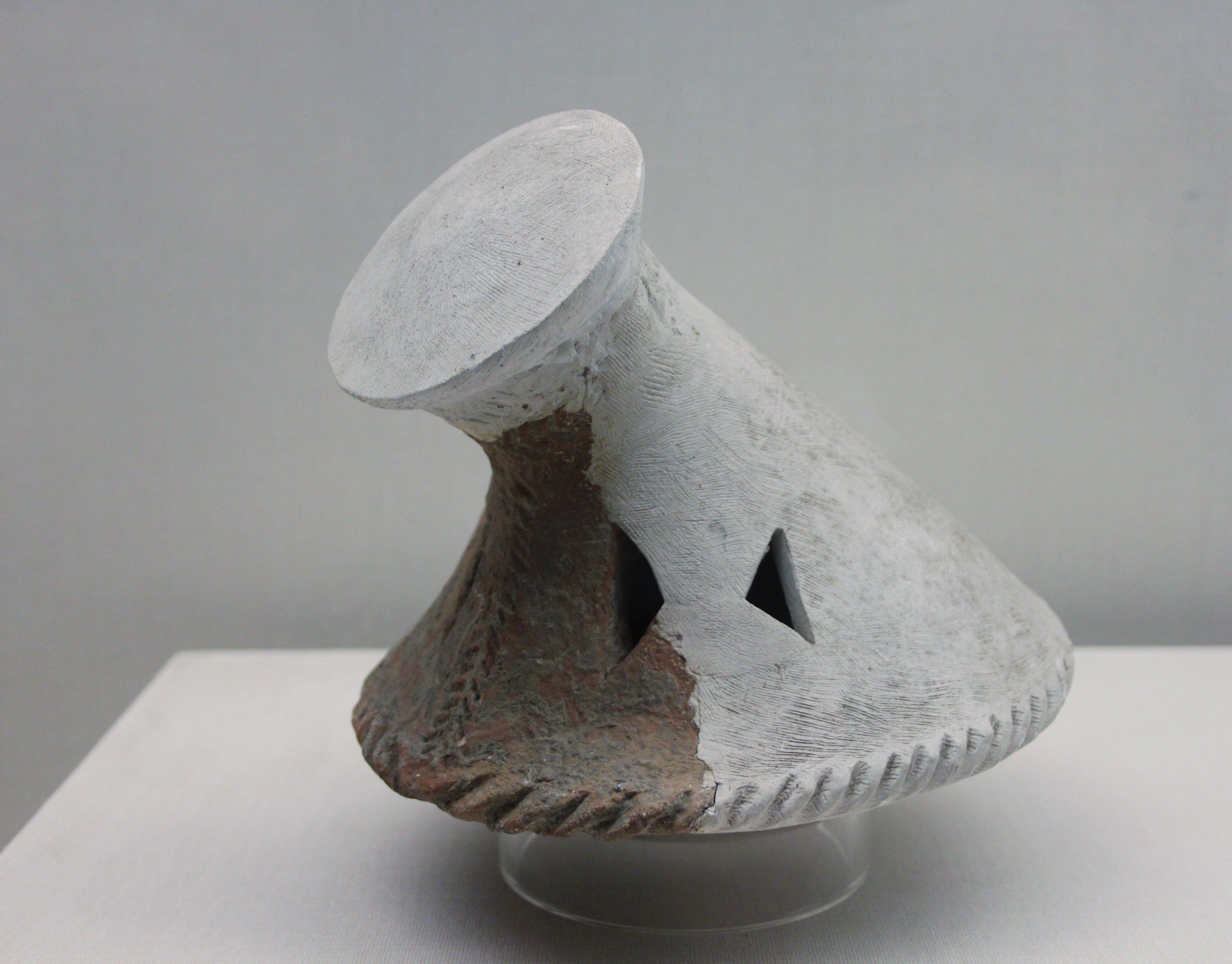
Reconstructed leg of a vessel

== See also ==
- List of Neolithic cultures of China
- Daxi culture
- Qujialing culture
- Nanzhuangtou
