= Jianghan Plain =

Alluvial plain of the Yangtze River in Hubei, China

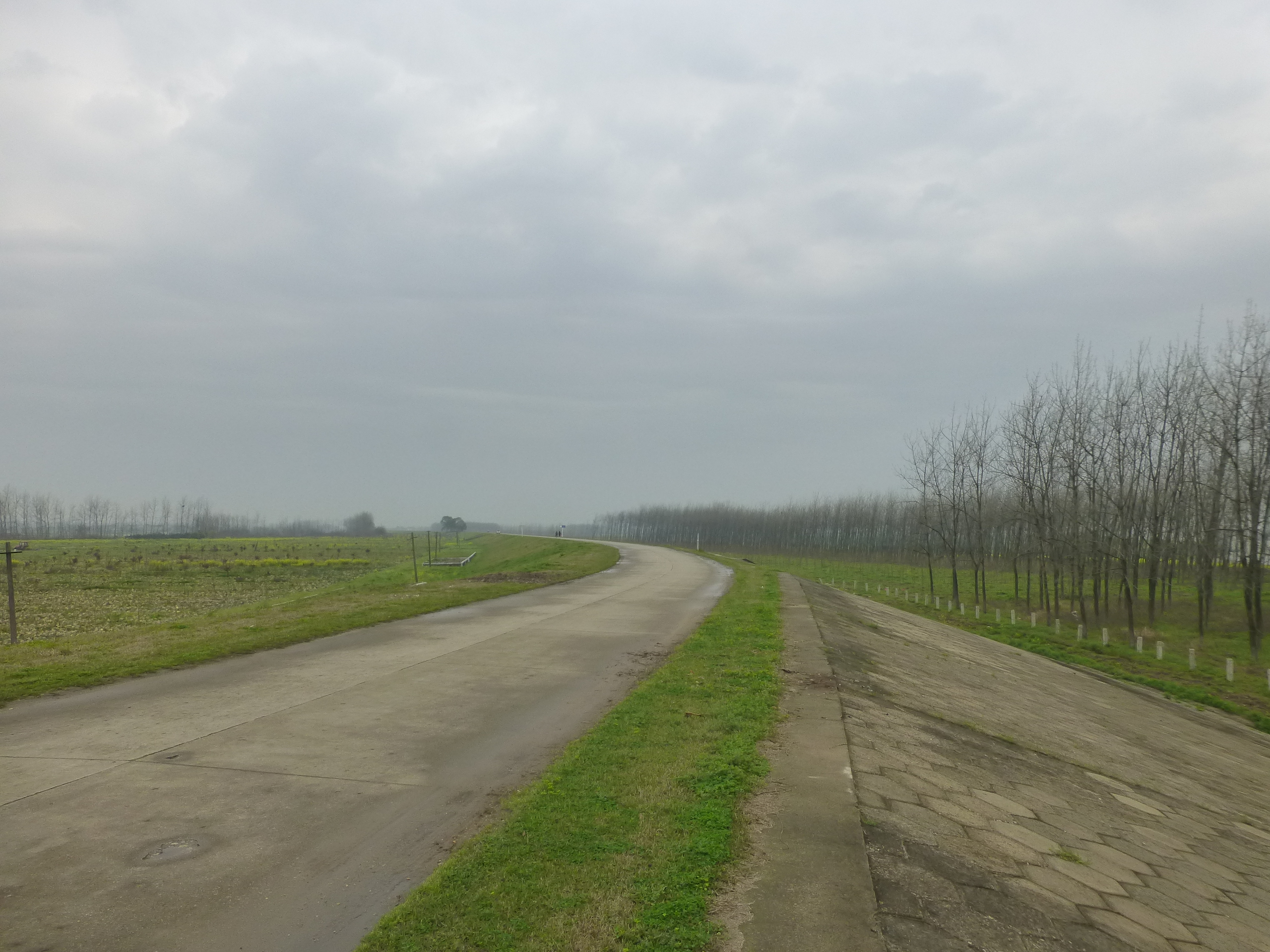
Levees stretch for hundreds of kilometers along the Yangtze and the Han rivers, protecting the fields and villages on the low-lying plain from seasonal flooding

Jianghan Plain (Chinese: 江汉平原; pinyin: Jiānghàn Píngyuán), named for the confluence of the Yangtze ('Jiang') and Han ('han') rivers, is an alluvial plain located in the middle and south of Hubei, China. Wuhan, the most populous city in Central China, is located on the plain. It shares the border with Dongtinghu Plain, and has an area of more than 30,000 square kilometers. The region was once a large wetland, but was gradually colonized by settlers beginning in the Neolithic period. This accelerated when the state of Chu established its capital there in the middle of the 1st millennium BC, and when the Qin and Han states built dikes to protect farmland from seasonal floods. The Jianghan area has been an important food grain region of China since at least the Ming dynasty.
