= Li County, Hunan =

Li County 澧县
- County
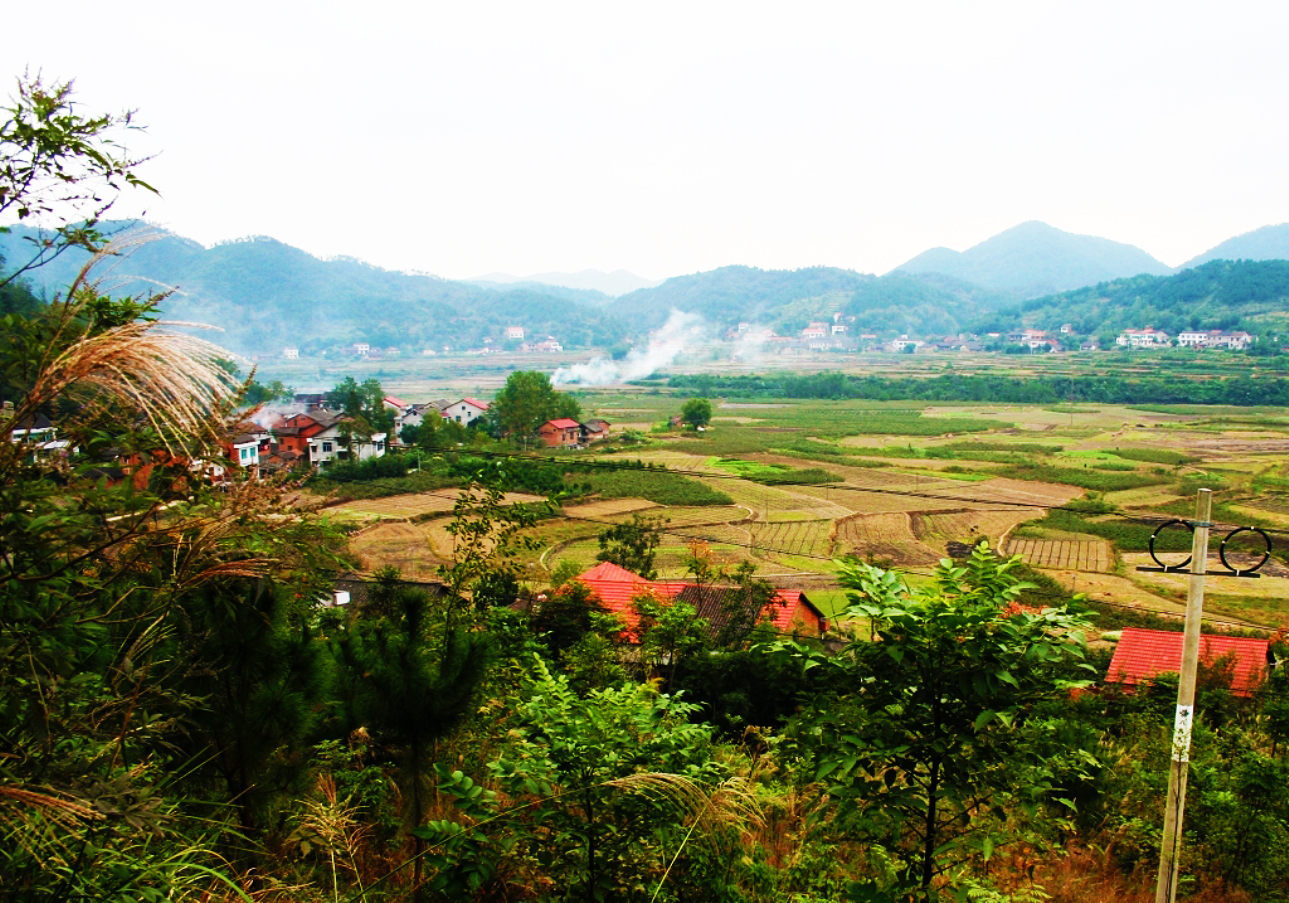

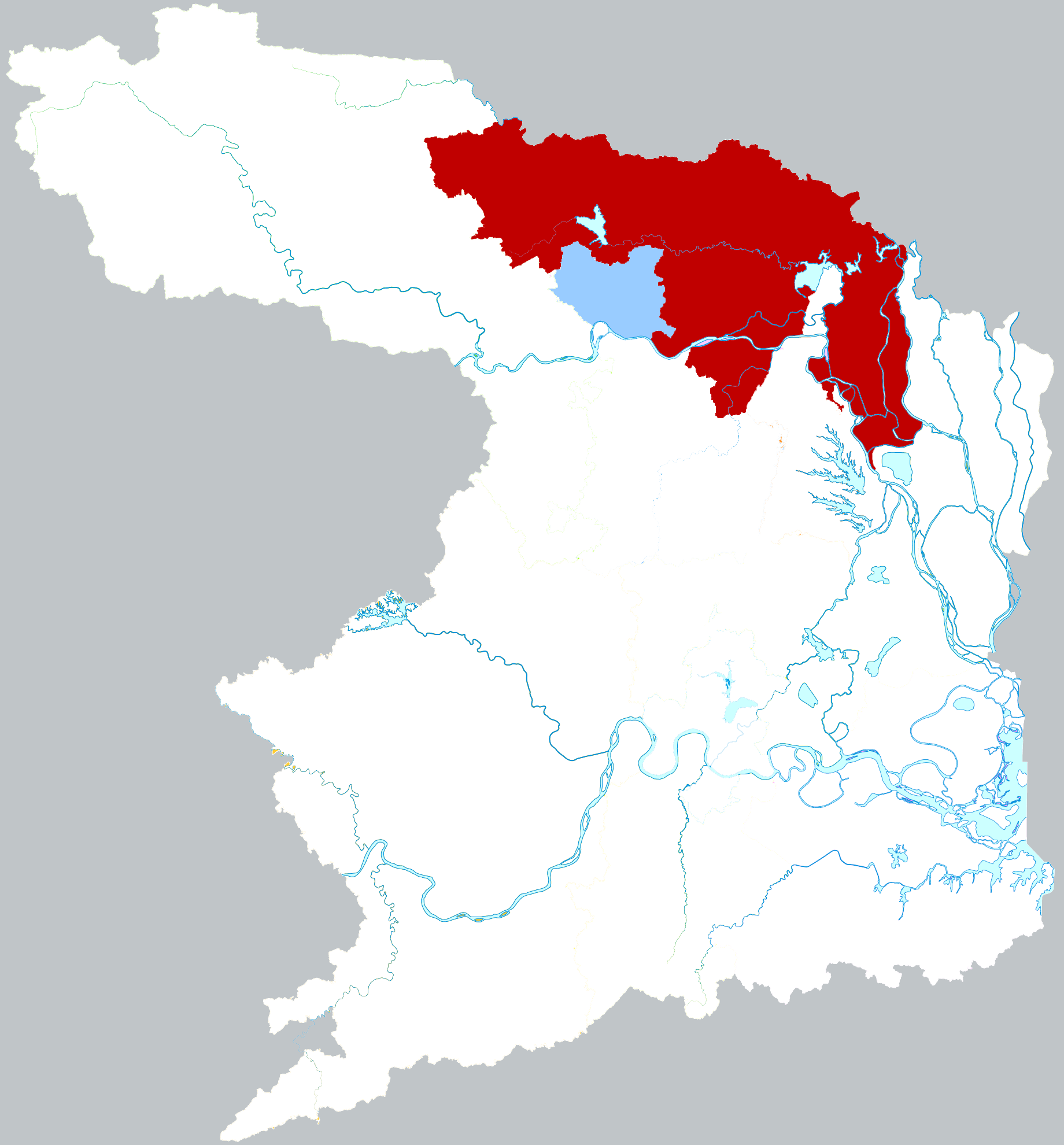
- Location of Li County within Changde

- Location in Hunan
- Coordinates: 29°41′56″N 111°38′46″E
- Country: People's Republic of China
- Province: Hunan
- Prefecture-level city: Changde

Area
  - Total: 2,075 km^{2} (801 sq mi)

Population
  - Total: 721,900
  - Density: 347.9/km^{2} (901.1/sq mi)
- Time zone: UTC+8 (China Standard)

Li County, or Lixian (simplified Chinese: 澧县; traditional Chinese: 澧縣; pinyin: Lǐ Xiàn) is a county in Hunan Province, China, under the administration of the prefecture-level city of Changde. The county is located in the north of Hunan Province, and it borders to the north by Songzi City and Gong'an County of Hubei Province, to the east by Anxiang County, to the south by Jinshi City and Linli County, and to the west by Shimen County. It has an area of 2,075 kilometres (1,289 mi) with a registered population of 919,500 (as of 2015). It is divided into 15 towns and four subdistricts under its jurisdiction, and the county seat is Liyang Subdistrict (澧阳街道).

== Administrative divisions ==
According to the result on adjustment of township-level administrative divisions of Li County, Hunan on November 23, 2015, Li County has 15 towns and four subdistricts under its jurisdiction. They are:

15 towns

- Cennan (涔南镇)
- Chengtoushan Town (城头山镇)
- Dayandang (大堰垱镇)
- Fuxing (复兴镇)
- Ganxitan (甘溪滩镇)
- Guanyuan (官垸镇)
- Huolianpo (火连坡镇)
- Jinluo (金罗镇)
- Linan (澧南镇)
- Matuopu (码头铺镇)
- Mengxi (梦溪镇)
- Rudong (如东镇)
- Wangjiachang (王家厂镇)
- Xiaodukou (小渡口镇)
- Yanjing (盐井镇)

4 Subdistricts

- Lidan Subdistrict (澧澹街道)
- Lipu (澧浦街道)
- Lixi (澧西街道)
- Liyang Subdistrict (澧阳街道)

== Climate ==
Climate data for Lixian, elevation 38 m (125 ft), (1991–2020 normals, extremes 1981–present)
Month	Jan	Feb	Mar	Apr	May	Jun	Jul	Aug	Sep	Oct	Nov	Dec	Year
Record high °C (°F)	22.6 (72.7)	29.6 (85.3)	34.5 (94.1)	35.7 (96.3)	36.6 (97.9)	37.8 (100.0)	39.8 (103.6)	40.1 (104.2)	38.5 (101.3)	34.7 (94.5)	30.9 (87.6)	23.8 (74.8)	40.1 (104.2)
Mean daily maximum °C (°F)	8.5 (47.3)	11.4 (52.5)	16.2 (61.2)	22.5 (72.5)	27.1 (80.8)	30.0 (86.0)	32.8 (91.0)	32.2 (90.0)	28.2 (82.8)	22.9 (73.2)	17.0 (62.6)	11.2 (52.2)	21.7 (71.0)
Daily mean °C (°F)	4.8 (40.6)	7.3 (45.1)	11.7 (53.1)	17.6 (63.7)	22.3 (72.1)	25.8 (78.4)	28.5 (83.3)	27.9 (82.2)	23.5 (74.3)	18.1 (64.6)	12.4 (54.3)	7.0 (44.6)	17.2 (63.0)
Mean daily minimum °C (°F)	2.0 (35.6)	4.2 (39.6)	8.3 (46.9)	13.9 (57.0)	18.7 (65.7)	22.6 (72.7)	25.3 (77.5)	24.7 (76.5)	20.3 (68.5)	14.9 (58.8)	9.2 (48.6)	3.9 (39.0)	14.0 (57.2)
Record low °C (°F)	−8.0 (17.6)	−4.2 (24.4)	−1.3 (29.7)	2.1 (35.8)	10.0 (50.0)	13.7 (56.7)	18.6 (65.5)	16.0 (60.8)	11.2 (52.2)	3.6 (38.5)	−0.6 (30.9)	−6.8 (19.8)	−8.0 (17.6)
Average precipitation mm (inches)	50.0 (1.97)	57.3 (2.26)	91.6 (3.61)	138.8 (5.46)	173.4 (6.83)	204.5 (8.05)	214.1 (8.43)	116.7 (4.59)	86.5 (3.41)	84.1 (3.31)	63.8 (2.51)	30.9 (1.22)	1,311.7 (51.65)
Average precipitation days (≥ 0.1 mm)	10.2	10.9	14.1	13.5	14.5	13.4	12.4	9.6	8.9	10.9	10.0	8.5	136.9
Average snowy days	5.0	3.1	1.2	0	0	0	0	0	0	0.1	0.2	1.6	11.2
Average relative humidity (%)	79	78	79	78	79	83	82	82	81	79	79	77	80
Mean monthly sunshine hours	72.8	75.8	107.0	134.8	146.8	146.7	204.4	207.1	150.1	126.6	106.3	90.9	1,569.3
Percentage possible sunshine	22	24	29	35	35	35	48	51	41	36	33	29	35
Source: China Meteorological Administration

== Famous sights ==
Chengtoushan Site (城头山): Chengtoushan is a prehistoric site which located in the village of Lanyue in the township of Chexi. This site is situated on a small plateau-like feature in the landscape, two or three meters above the surrounding area. The local villagers call it Pingtoushan("Flat Top Hill"). It has also been known for generations as the location of an ancient walled site.
