= National archaeological park of China =

Monuments declared heritage by China

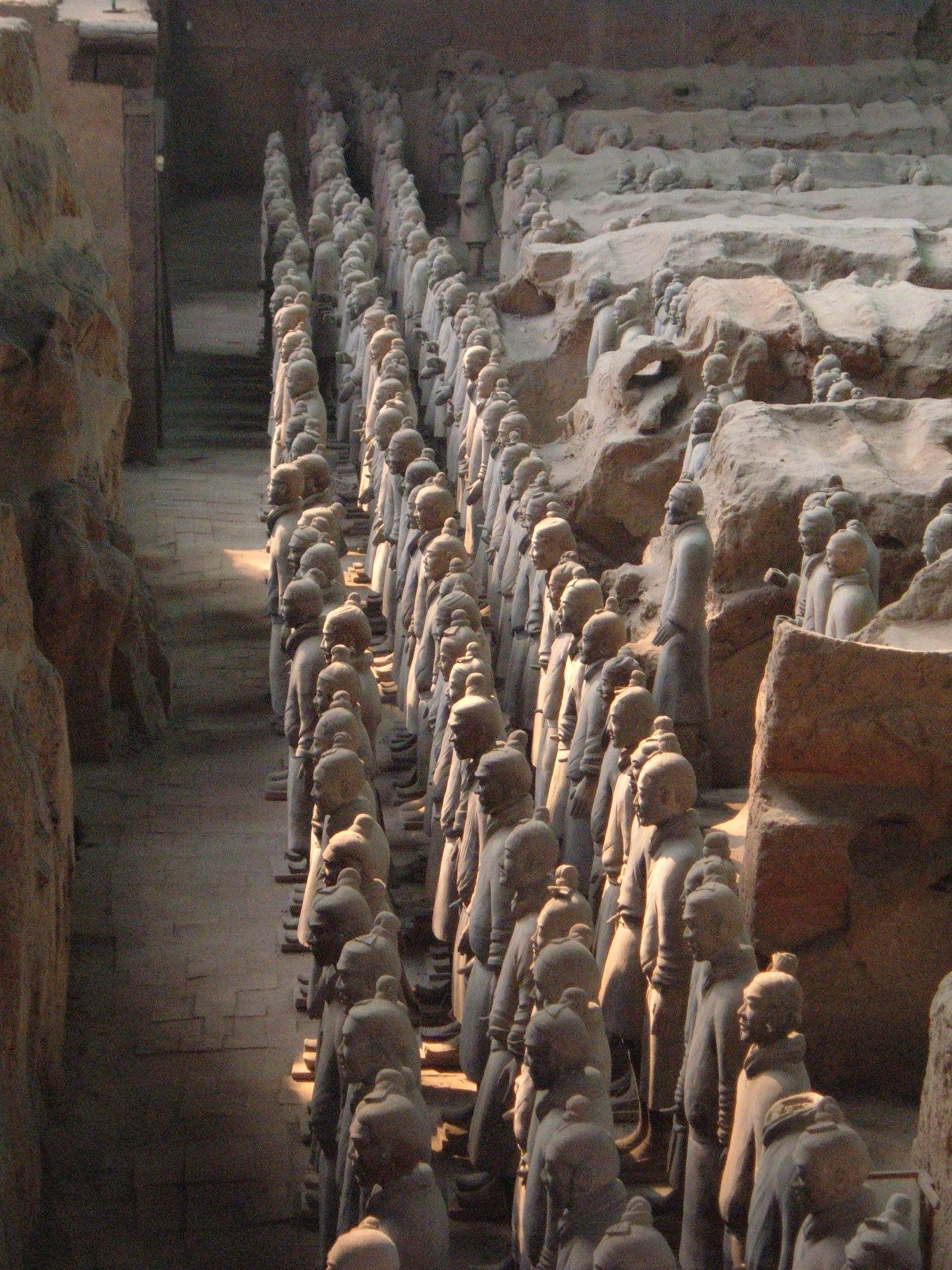
Terracotta Army of the Mausoleum of the First Qin Emperor

The national archaeological park (Chinese: 国家考古遗址公园) of China is a designation created by the State Administration of Cultural Heritage (SACH) in 2009 to preserve and present large-scale archaeological sites. National archaeological parks must have previously been designated as Major Historical and Cultural Sites Protected at the National Level, and are considered to have high historical, cultural, and academic value. They include ancient settlements, cities and towns, palaces, temples and caves, engineering and manufacturing sites, and mausoleums and cemeteries. Many parks also have on-site museums.

The first 12 national archaeological parks were announced in 2010, and since then 24 more parks have been added to the list, bringing the total to 36. In addition, more than 60 sites have been designated as candidates for the national archaeological park status.

== Regulation ==
On 17 December 2009, the State Administration of Cultural Heritage issued the National Archaeological Park Administration Measures. According to the regulation, an archaeological site must meet five criteria before applying for national archaeological park status: it must be a Major Historical and Cultural Site Protected at the National Level; its provincial-level government has issued and implemented measures to protect the site; an archaeological work plan has been approved and commenced; has an archaeological park plan in compliance with the protection measures; has a specialized administration entity with corporate status.

== List of national archaeological parks ==
23 archaeological sites applied for the national archaeological park designation in 2010. On 9 October 2010, the State Administration of Cultural Heritage (SACH) announced the first batch of 12 parks whose applications were approved.

In December 2013, the SACH announced the second batch of 12 national archaeological parks. In December 2017, the third batch of 12 national archaeological parks was announced. In December 2022, the fourth batch of 19 national archaeological parks was announced, bringing the total to 55.

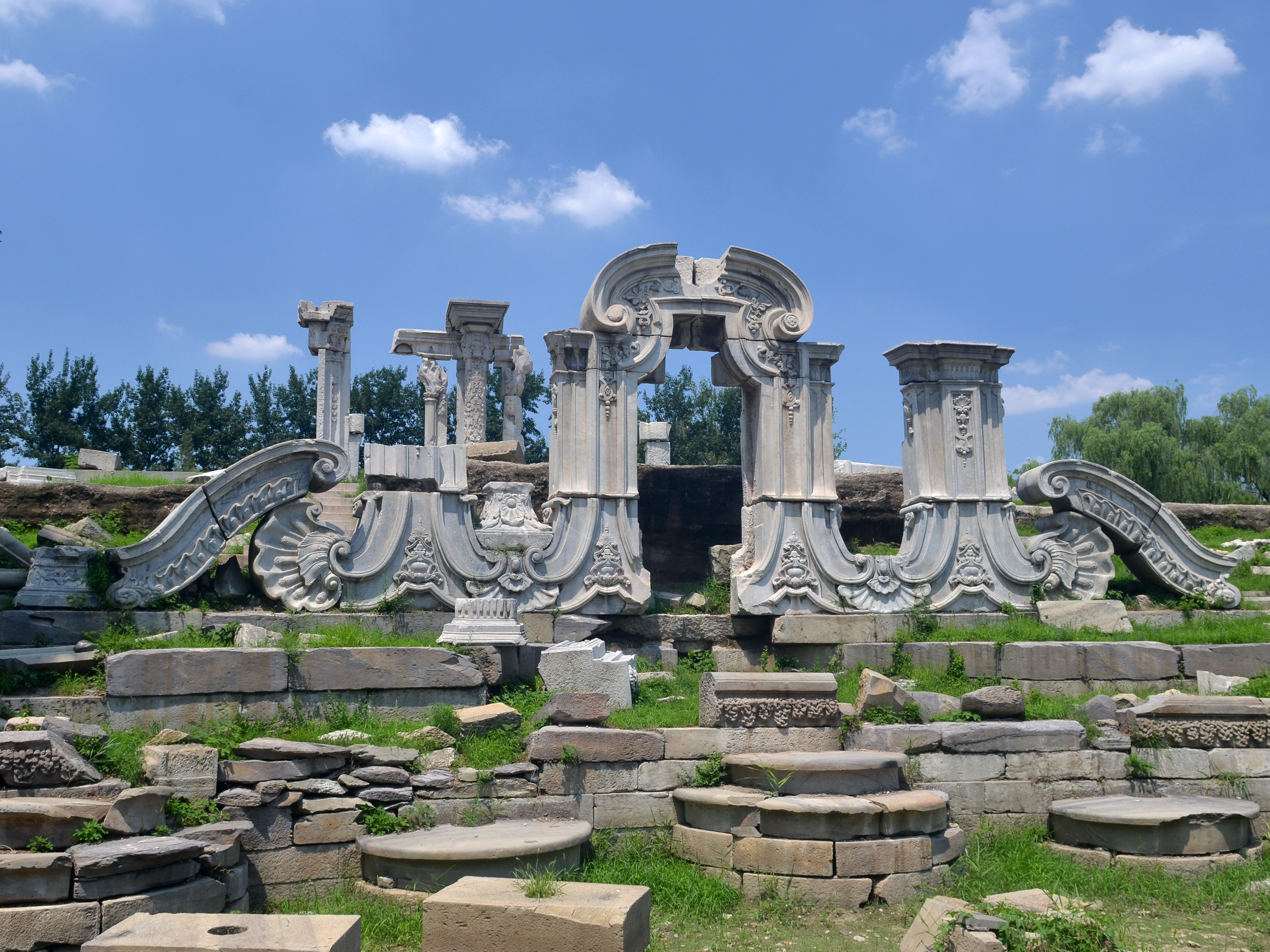
Old Summer Palace, Beijing

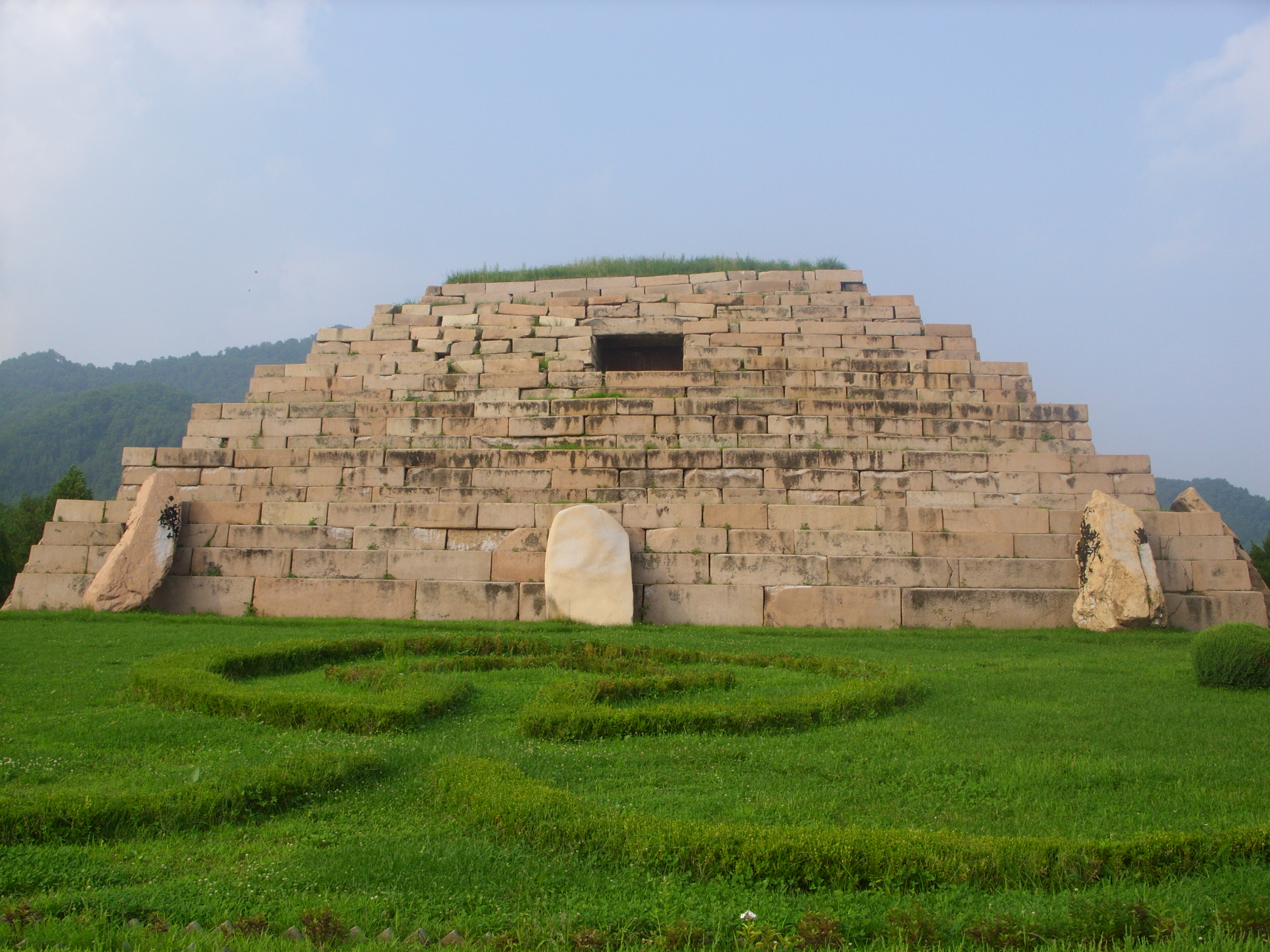
Tomb of the General, Ji'an Gaogouli National Archaeological Park

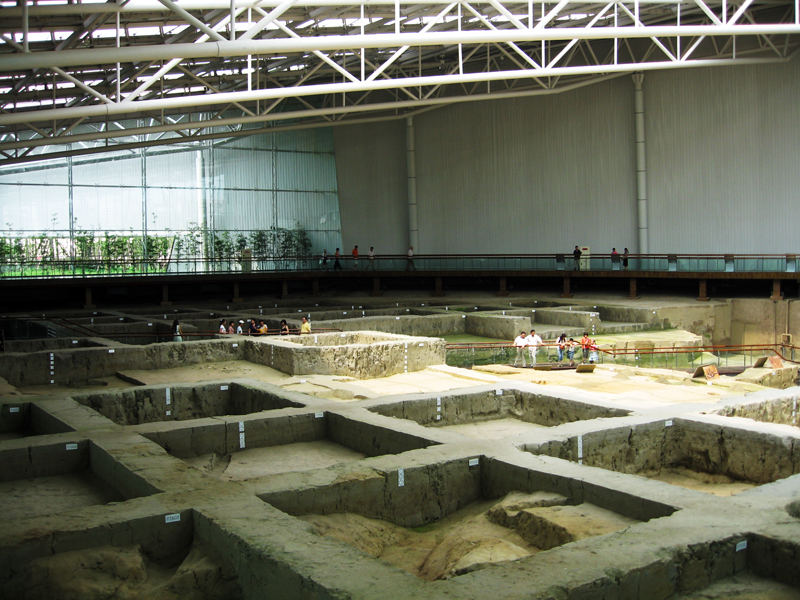
Jinsha, Sichuan

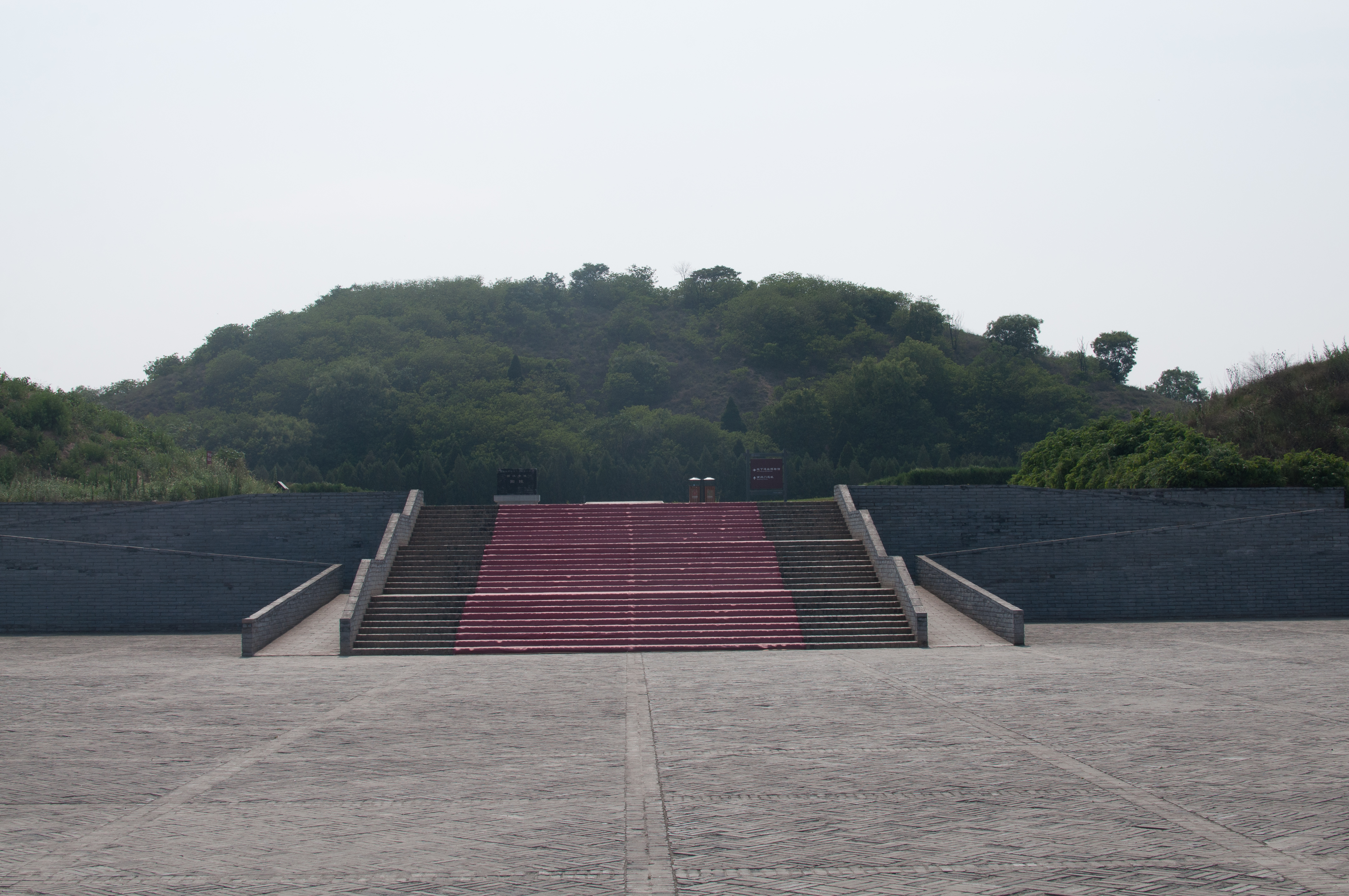
Han Yang Ling, the mausoleum of Emperor Jing of Han

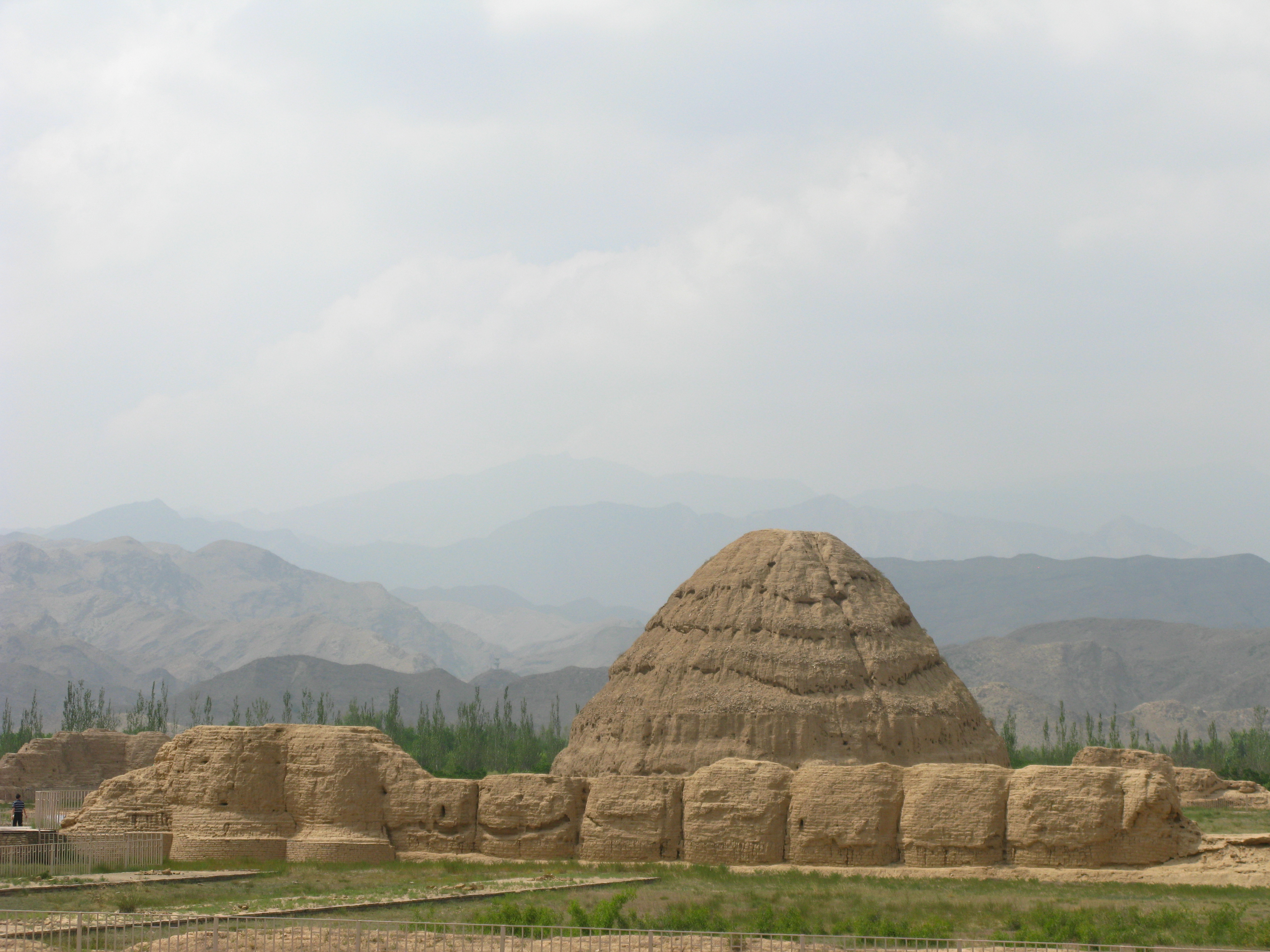
Western Xia Mausoleums

National archaeological park	Province	Batch
Old Summer Palace (Yuanmingyuan)	Beijing	1
Zhoukoudian (Peking Man site)	Beijing	1
Ji'an Gaogouli (Goguryeo)	Jilin	1
Hongshan	Jiangsu	1
Liangzhu	Zhejiang	1
Yinxu	Henan	1
Luoyang of Sui–Tang Dynasties	Henan	1
Sanxingdui	Sichuan	1
Jinsha	Sichuan	1
Han Yang Ling	Shaanxi	1
Mausoleum of the First Qin Emperor	Shaanxi	1
Daming Palace	Shaanxi	1
Niuheliang	Liaoning	2
Zhongjing of Bohai	Jilin	2
Shangjing of Bohai	Heilongjiang	2
Yuyaochang (Jingdezhen Imperial Kiln)	Jiangxi	2
Qufu, Capital of Lu	Shandong	2
Nanwang Hub of the Grand Canal	Shandong	2
Luoyang of Han–Wei Dynasties	Henan	2
Xiongjiazhong	Hubei	2
Tongguan Kiln	Hunan	2
Zengpiyan	Guangxi	2
Diaoyucheng	Chongqing	2
Beiting City	Xinjiang	2
Zhongdu of Yuan	Hebei	3
Dayao Longquan Kilns	Zhejiang	3
Shanglin Lake Yue Kilns	Zhejiang	3
Zhongdu of Ming	Anhui	3
Wanshouyan	Fujian	3
Chengziya	Shandong	3
Jizhou Kiln	Jiangxi	3
Zheng–Han City	Henan	3
Panlongcheng	Hubei	3
Chengtoushan	Hunan	3
Weiyang Palace	Shaanxi	3
Western Xia Mausoleums	Ningxia	3
Nihewan	Hebei	4
Zhaowangcheng	Hebei	4
Yecheng	Hebei	4
Shangjing of Liao	Inner Mongolia	4
Anji Ancient City	Zhejiang	4
Lingjiatan	Anhui	4
Chengcun Han City	Fujian	4
Marquisate of Haihun	Jiangxi	4
Yangshao	Henan	4
Erlitou	Henan	4
Zhengzhou Shang City	Henan	4
Qujialing	Hubei	4
Longwan	Hubei	4
Tanheli	Hunan	4
Jingjiang Princes' Palace and Mausoleums	Guangxi	4
Qiong Kiln	Sichuan	4
Shimao	Shaanxi	4
Tongwancheng	Shaanxi	4
Qianling Mausoleum	Shaanxi	4

== Candidate parks ==
In addition to the approved parks, the SACH has also given a number of parks the status of "candidate national archaeological parks". When announcing the first batch of 12 approved parks, it also announced 23 candidate parks, of which 11 were later approved in the second batch announced in 2013.

- Jinyang City, Shanxi
- Niuheliang, Liaoning (approved in the second batch)
- Zhongjing of Bohai, Jilin (approved in the second batch)
- Yangzhou City, Jiangsu
- Yuyaochang (Jingdezhen Imperial Kiln), Jiangxi (approved in the second batch)
- Nanwang Hub of the Grand Canal, Shandong (approved in the second batch)
- Qufu, Capital of Lu, Shandong (approved in the second batch)
- Dawenkou, Shandong
- Luoyang of Han-Wei Dynasties, Henan (approved in the second batch)
- Zhengzhou Shang City, Henan (approved in the fourth batch)
- Sanyangzhuang, Henan
- Jinancheng (including Balingshan and Xiongjiazhong), Hubei (Xiongjiazhong approved in the second batch)
- Tongguan Kiln, Hunan (approved in the second batch)
- Liye Ancient City, Hunan
- Laosicheng, Hunan
- Jingjiang Princes' Palace and Mausoleums, Guangxi (approved in the fourth batch)
- Zengpiyan, Guangxi (approved in the second batch)
- Kele, Guizhou
- Chang'an of Han, Shaanxi
- Xianyang of Qin, Shaanxi
- Suoyang City, Gansu
- Beiting City, Xinjiang (approved in the second batch)
- Diaoyucheng, Chongqing (approved in the second batch)

31 candidate parks were announced together with the second batch of approved parks in 2013, of which 9 were later approved in the third batch announced in 2017.

- Zhongdu of Yuan, Hebei 元中都 (approved in the third batch)
- Nihewan, Hebei (approved in the fourth batch)
- Zhaowangcheng, Hebei 赵王城 (approved in the fourth batch)
- Pujindu and Puzhou City, Shanxi 蒲津渡与蒲州故城
- Shangjing of Liao, Inner Mongolia 辽上京 (approved in the fourth batch)
- Salawusu, Inner Mongolia 萨拉乌苏
- Jinniushan, Liaoning
- Luotong Mountain City, Jilin 罗通山城
- Shangjing of Jin, Heilongjiang 金上京
- Helü City, Jiangsu 阖闾城
- Lingjiatan, Anhui 凌家滩 (approved in the fourth batch)
- Zhongdu of Ming, Anhui 明中都皇故城 (approved in the third batch)
- Chengcun Han City, Fujian 城村汉城 (approved in the fourth batch)
- Wanshouyan, Fujian 万寿岩 (approved in the third batch)
- Jizhou Kiln, Jiangxi 吉州窑 (approved in the third batch)
- Linzi, Capital of Qi, Shandong
- Chengziya, Shandong (approved in the third batch)
- Zheng–Han City, Henan 郑韩故城 (approved in the third batch)
- Yanshi Shang City, Henan 偃师商城
- Chengyang City, Henan 城阳城址
- Tonglüshan, Hubei 铜绿山
- Longwan, Hubei 龙湾 (approved in the fourth batch)
- Panlongcheng, Hubei (approved in the third batch)
- Tanheli, Hunan (approved in the fourth batch)
- Chengtoushan, Hunan (approved in the third batch)
- Taihe City, Yunnan 太和城
- Tongwancheng, Shaanxi (approved in the fourth batch)
- Longgangsi, Shaanxi 龙岗寺
- Dadiwan, Gansu 大地湾
- Western Xia Mausoleums, Ningxia (approved in the third batch)
- Lajia, Qinghai

In December 2017, 32 candidate parks were announced together with the third batch of approved parks.

- Capital of the Zhongshan Kingdom, Hebei
- Yecheng, Hebei (approved in the fourth batch)
- Taosi, Shanxi
- Tuchengzi, Inner Mongolia
- Mopancun Mountain City, Jilin
- Longqiuzhuang, Jiangsu
- Majiabang, Zhejiang
- Anji Ancient City (approved in the fourth batch) and Longshan Yue Cemetery, Zhejiang
- Shouchun City, Anhui
- Shuangdun, Bengbu, Anhui
- Yuhuicun, Anhui
- Wucheng, Jiangxi
- Marquisate of Haihun, Jiangxi (approved in the fourth batch)
- Liangchengzhen, Shandong
- Yangshao, Henan (approved in the fourth batch)
- Erlitou, Henan (approved in the fourth batch)
- Jiahu, Henan
- Miaodigou, Henan
- Dahecun, Henan
- Qujialing, Hubei (approved in the fourth batch)
- Shijiahe, Hubei
- Sujialong 苏家垄, Hubei
- Bijiashan Chaozhou Kiln, Guangdong
- Tomb of Francis Xavier and Dazhouwan, Guangdong
- Hepu Han City and Cemetery, Guangxi
- Qiong Kiln, Sichuan (approved in the fourth batch)
- Qianling Mausoleum, Shaanxi (approved in the fourth batch)
- Epang Palace, Shaanxi
- Zhouyuan, Shaanxi
- Duling Mausoleum, Shaanxi
- Shimao, Shaanxi (approved in the fourth batch)
- Subashi Temple, Xinjiang

In December 2022, 32 candidate parks were announced together with the fourth batch of approved parks.

- Liulihe, Beijing
- Lower Capital of Yan, Hebei
- Ding Kiln, Hebei
- Changbai Mountain Temple, Jilin
- Caoxieshan, Jiangsu
- Shangshan, Zhejiang
- Hemudu, Zhejiang
- Six Tombs of the Song Dynasty, Zhejiang
- Fanchang Kiln, Anhui
- Nanshan, Fujian
- Kuzhaikeng Kiln, Fujian
- Dehua Kiln, Fujian
- Tongling Copper Mine, Jiangxi
- Pingliangtai Ancient City, Henan
- Guo State Cemetery, Henan
- Qingliangsi Ru Kiln, Henan

== See also ==
- China's 100 major archaeological discoveries in the 20th century
