= Salvatore Lorusso =

- Years active: 1972-present

Academic background
- Education: University of Bari

Academic work
- Discipline: Environmental Chemistry and Cultural Heritage
- Institutions: Department of Cultural Heritage, University of Bologna; Institute of Cultural Heritage of Zhejiang

Salvatore Lorusso (fl. 1972-present) is a former professor of Environmental Chemistry and Cultural Heritage in the Department of Cultural Heritage at the University of Bologna, and founder of the journal, Conservation Science in Cultural Heritage. He has also been named a Foreign Member of the Russian Academy of Natural Sciences, and an Emeritus Professor of the Institute of Cultural Heritage of Zhejiang University in China. In the mid-2010s, Lorusso oversaw the restoration of Buddhist sculptures from the Qingzhou Longxing Temple in Zhejiang. Lorusso has also written on the Shroud of Turin, and several articles on Leonardo da Vinci, particularly on the Mona Lisa, and examining evidence of the Isleworth Mona Lisa also being by Leonardo.

== Career ==
Lorusso received a degree in chemistry from the University of Bari in 1972. His first significant publication was "L'allume come ignifugo nel periodo Greco-Romano" ("Alum as a fire retardant in the Greco-Roman period"), published in 1978 with Walter Ciusa, in Studi in memoria di Federigo Melis I. From 1972 to 1997, he worked for various periods at the Istituto di Merceologia (Institute of Commodity Sciences) at the University of Bologna, as an associate professor at the Sapienza University of Rome, and as a full professor at the University of Cagliari and then at the Tuscia University in Viterbo. From 1997 to 2014, he was again a full professor at the University of Bologna, where he established and led the Laboratory for Cultural Heritage in the Department of Cultural Heritage.

In May 2000, Lorusso served on a scientific committee directing an international conference in Ravenna sponsored by l'Associazione "Il Saggiatore musicale", titled "...Fragmenta ne pereant (Latin: ...that nothing may be lost). In 2001, Lorusso launched the journal, Conservation Science in Cultural Heritage, with the intention of providing means to train and inform readers in the protection and enhancement of cultural and environmental heritage. He also established the eleven-volume series "I beni cultur-ali e l'ambiente" ("Cultural heritage and the environment"), and the two-volume "La formazione e la ricerca nel settore dei beni culturali e ambientali" (" Training and research in the cultural and environmental heritage sector"). A 2011 study published by Lorusso and others subjected two photographs of the Shroud of Turin to detailed modern digital image processing, one of them being a reproduction of the photographic negative taken by Giuseppe Enrie in 1931. They did not find any images of flowers or coins or anything else on either image, they noted that the faint images identified by Alan Whanger were "only visible by incrementing the photographic contrast", and they concluded that these signs may be linked to protuberances in the yarn, and possibly also to the alteration and influence of the texture of Giuseppe Enrie's photographic negative during its development in 1931.

In 2014, Lorusso was appointed Professor Emeritus of the Institute of Cultural Heritage of Zhejiang, and in July 2015, Lorusso was chosen to direct "[a] new Italian research project dedicated to the restoration and enhancement of the statues kept in the Buddhist temple of Qingzhou Longxing" (龍興寺) in Shandong; one of China's 100 major archaeological discoveries in the 20th century. Lorusso was described as having "laid the foundations" for the restoration project during his previous visit to the Qingzhou Museum and Zhejiang University. Also in 2015, Lorusso and professor Andrea Natali, also of the University of Bologna, published an exhaustive analysis of Mona Lisa paintings and copies, and endorsed the two-Mona Lisa theory, concluding that the Isleworth Mona Lisa was an original work by Leonardo. In 2019, Lorusso participated in a meeting with journalists on the authenticity of the Isleworth Mona Lisa, along with President of the Regional Council Eugenio Giani, Mona Lisa Foundation President Markus A. Frey, professor Jean-Pierre Isbouts, and historian Umberto Cecchi.

== Publications ==
Lorusso has been an author on more than 400 publications, primarily journal articles. These include:

- "L'allume come ignifugo nel periodo Greco-Romano" (1978), with Walter Ciusa
- "La contaminazione ambientale ed il degrado dei materiali di interesse storico-artistico" (1995)
- "Inquinamento atmosferico e degrado di monumenti e ambienti storico-artistici" (1997)
- "The Shroud of Turin between history and science: an ongoing debate", Conservation Science in Cultural Heritage, Vol 11 (2011), University of Bologna. With Chiara Matteucci, Andrea Natali, Tania Chinni, and Laura Solla.
- Lorusso, Salvatore; Natali, Andrea (December 30, 2015). "Mona Lisa: A Comparative Evaluation of the Different Versions and Their Copies". Conservation Science in Cultural Heritage. 15 (1): 57–109. doi:10.6092/issn.1973-9494/6168 – via conservation-science.unibo.it. With Andrea Natali.
