= Qingzhou Longxing Temple =

Buddhist temple in Qingzhou, Shandong, China

- 龍興寺
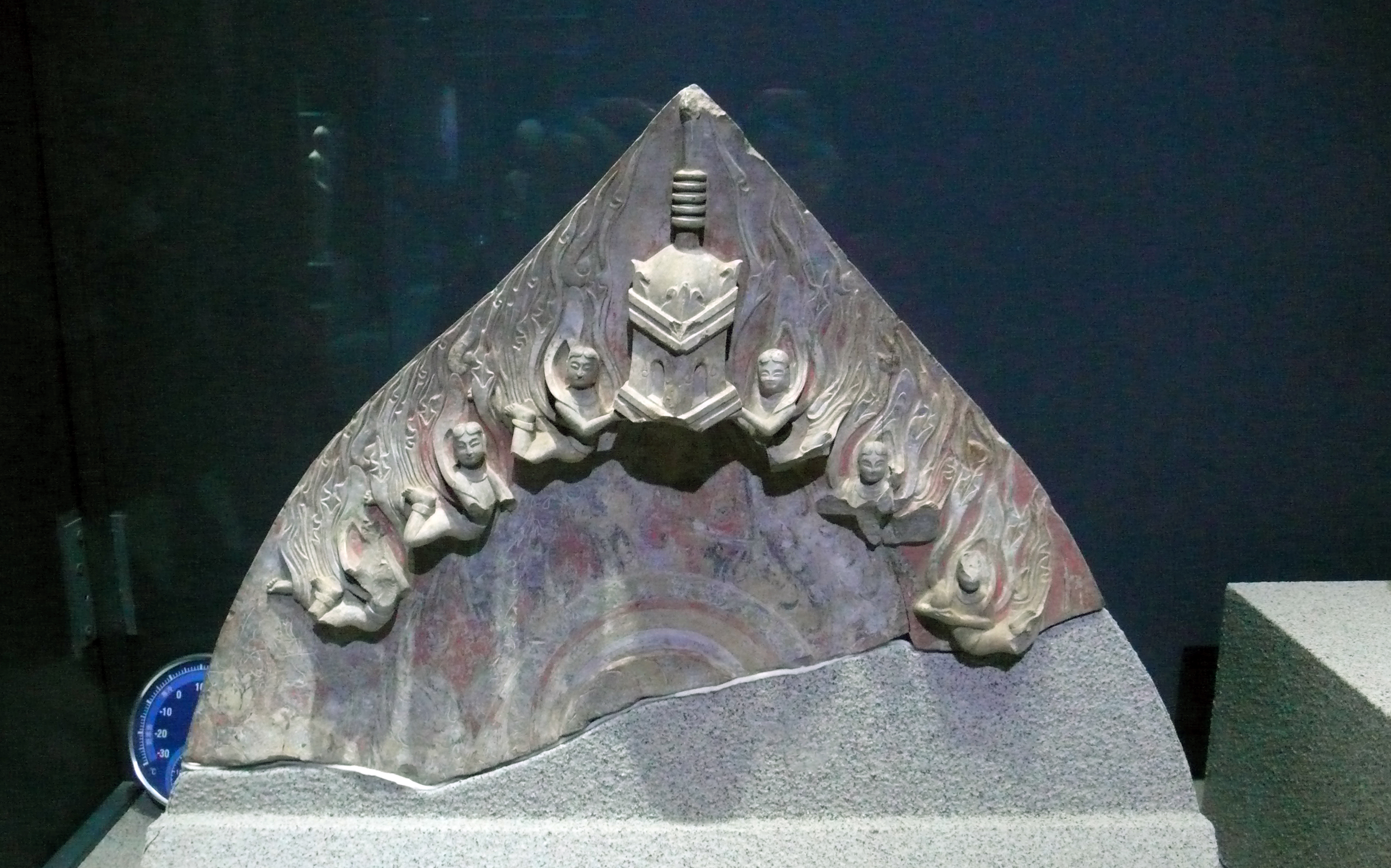
- Buddhist statue from Qingzhou Longxing Temple

- Location within China

Religion
- Affiliation: Buddhism

Location
- Location: Qingzhou, Shandong
- Country: China
- Interactive map of Qingzhou Longxing Temple
- Coordinates: 36.6841°N 118.4625°E

Architecture
- Completed: Northern and Southern dynasties

Qingzhou Longxing Temple (Chinese: 龍興寺; lóng xīng sì) was a Northern and Southern dynasties-era Buddhist temple in Qingzhou, Shandong, China. It has been deemed one of China's 100 major archaeological discoveries in the 20th century, containing a hoard of Buddhist statues.

The temple was built during the period of the Northern and Southern dynasties, and was destroyed some 800 years later. The location was rediscovered in 1996, when a stone oil lamp was discovered during the refurbishment of a school sports field. Subsequent excavation uncovered more than 400 statues on the site, which were primarily placed in the collection of the Shenzhen Museum. In July 2015, it was announced that Italian professor Salvatore Lorusso, of the Department of Cultural Heritage at the University of Bologna, would direct "[a] new Italian research project dedicated to the restoration and enhancement of the statues kept in the Buddhist temple of Qingzhou Longxing".

== Gallery ==
Location of the temple, and artifacts found at the site:

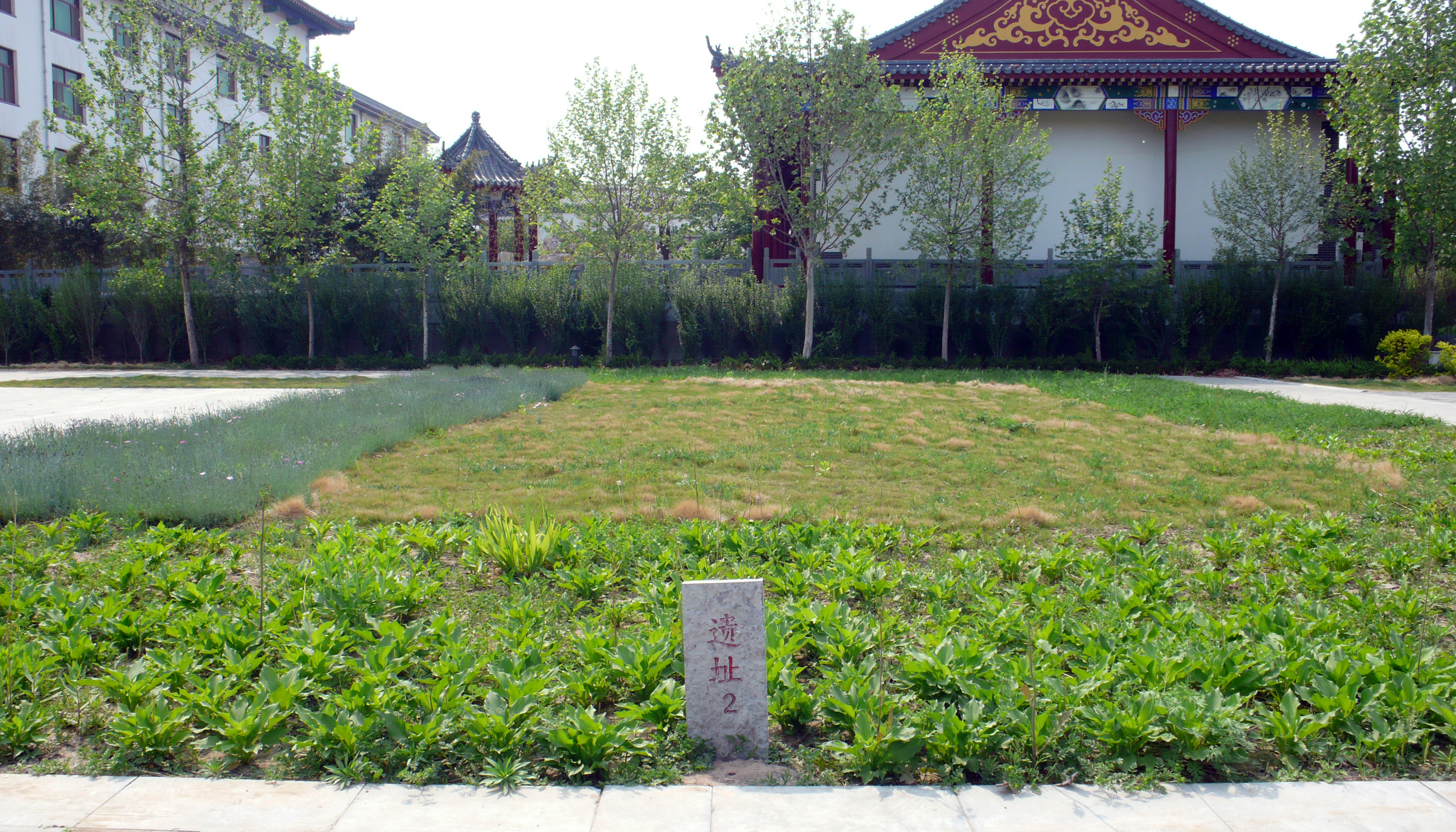
Archaelogicial site of the Qingzhou Longxing Temple

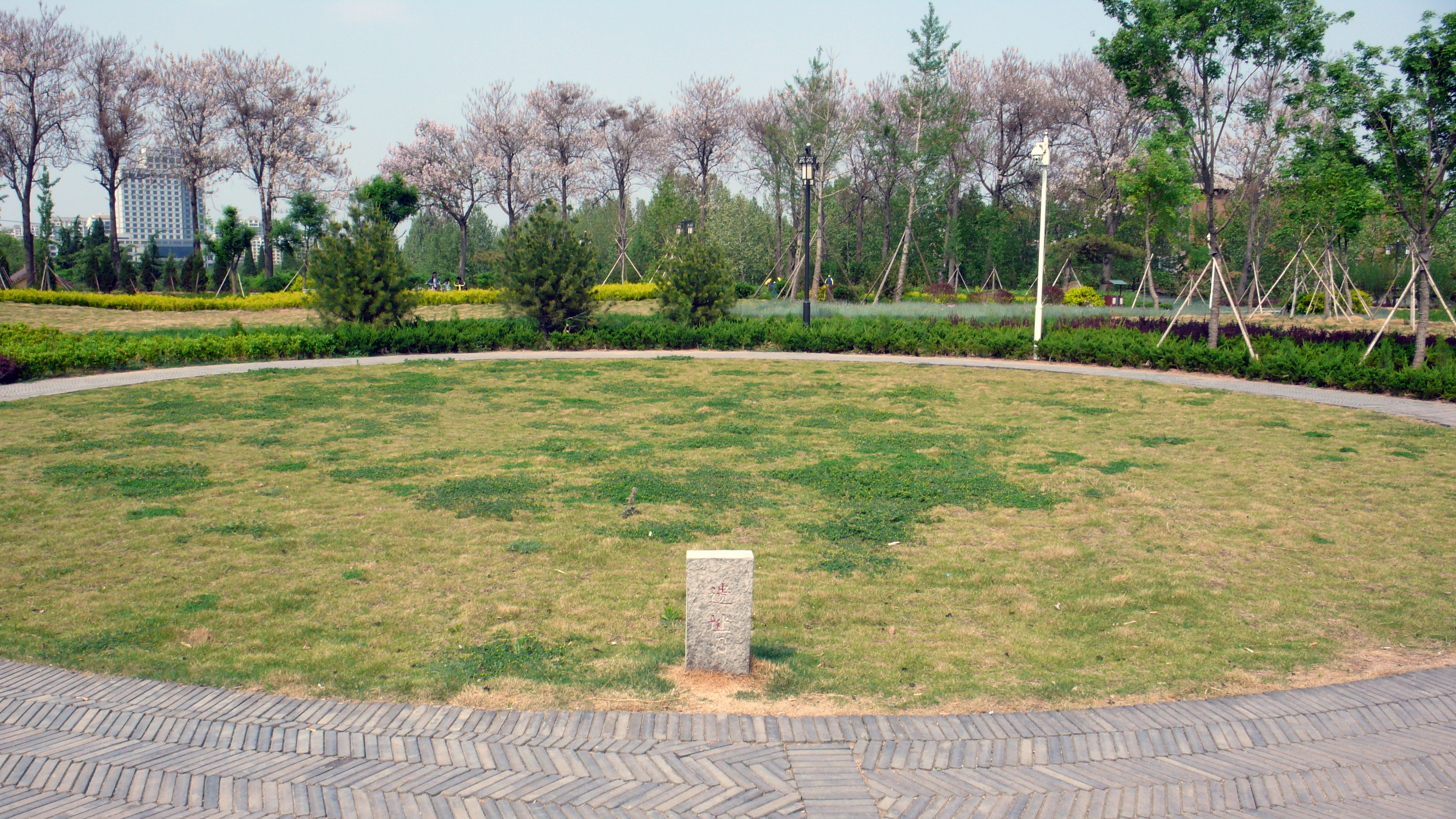
Archaelogicial site of the Qingzhou Longxing Temple

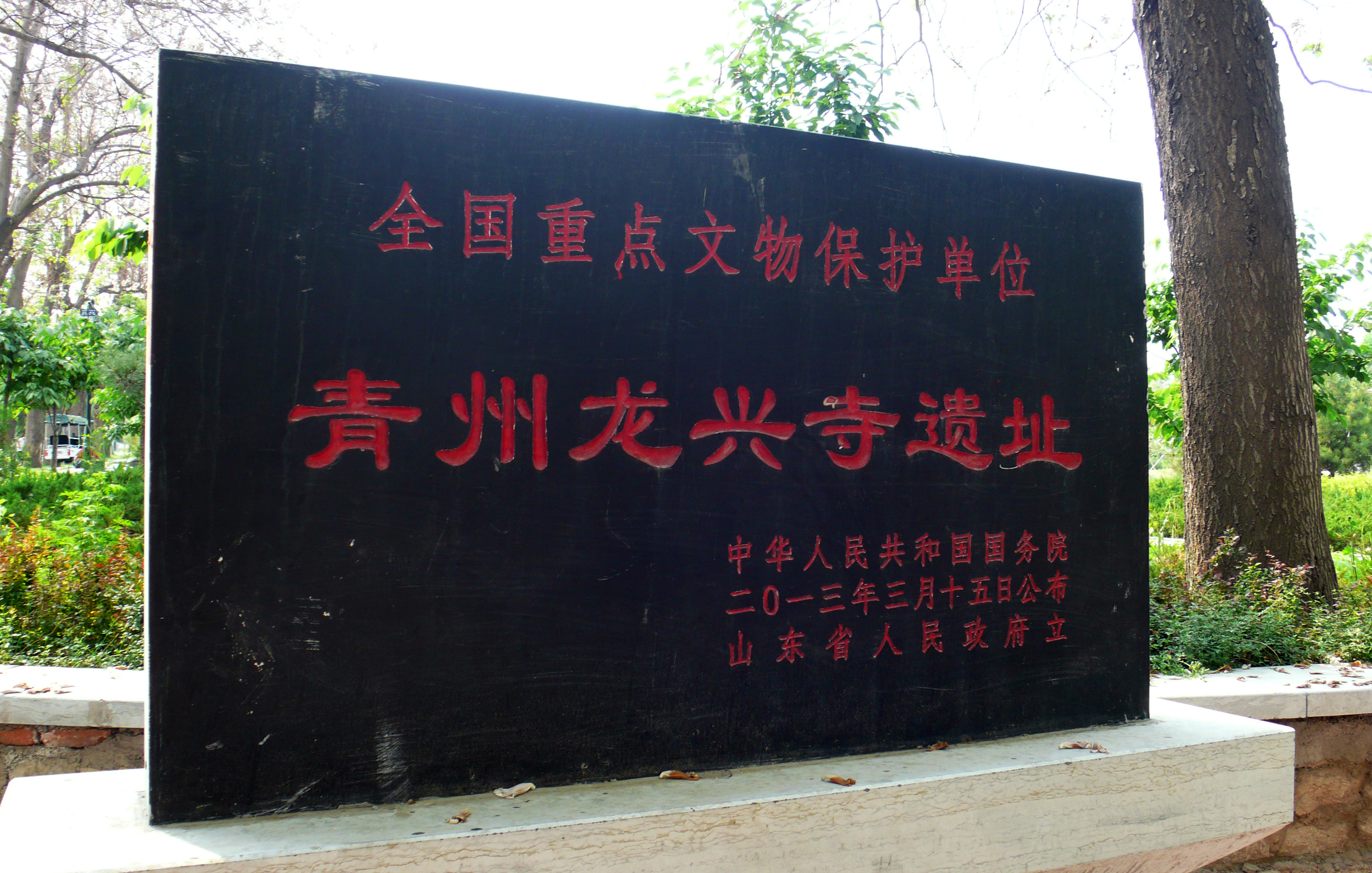
Sign indicating the location of the Qingzhou Longxing Temple

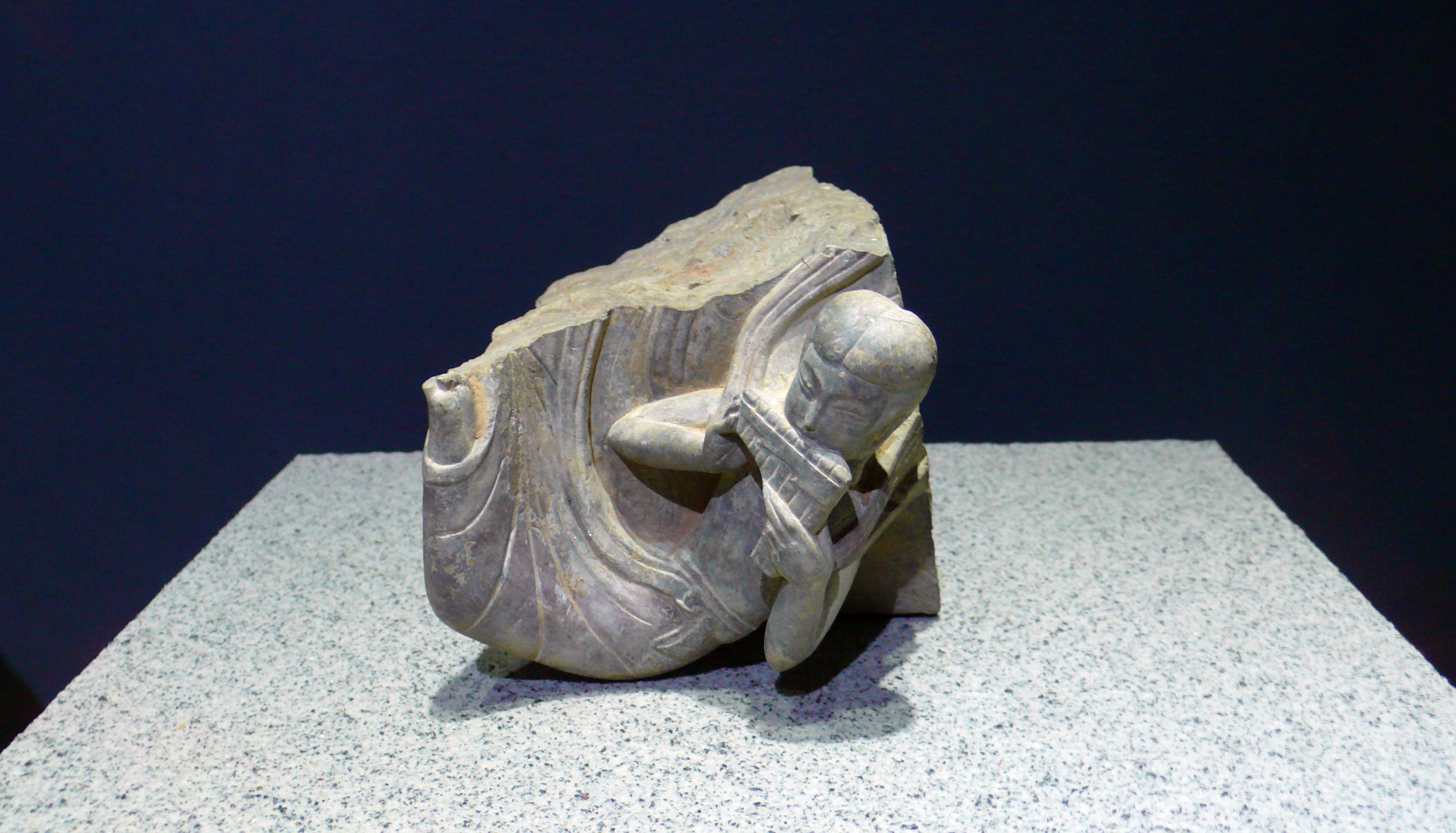
Statue from the Qingzhou Longxing Temple

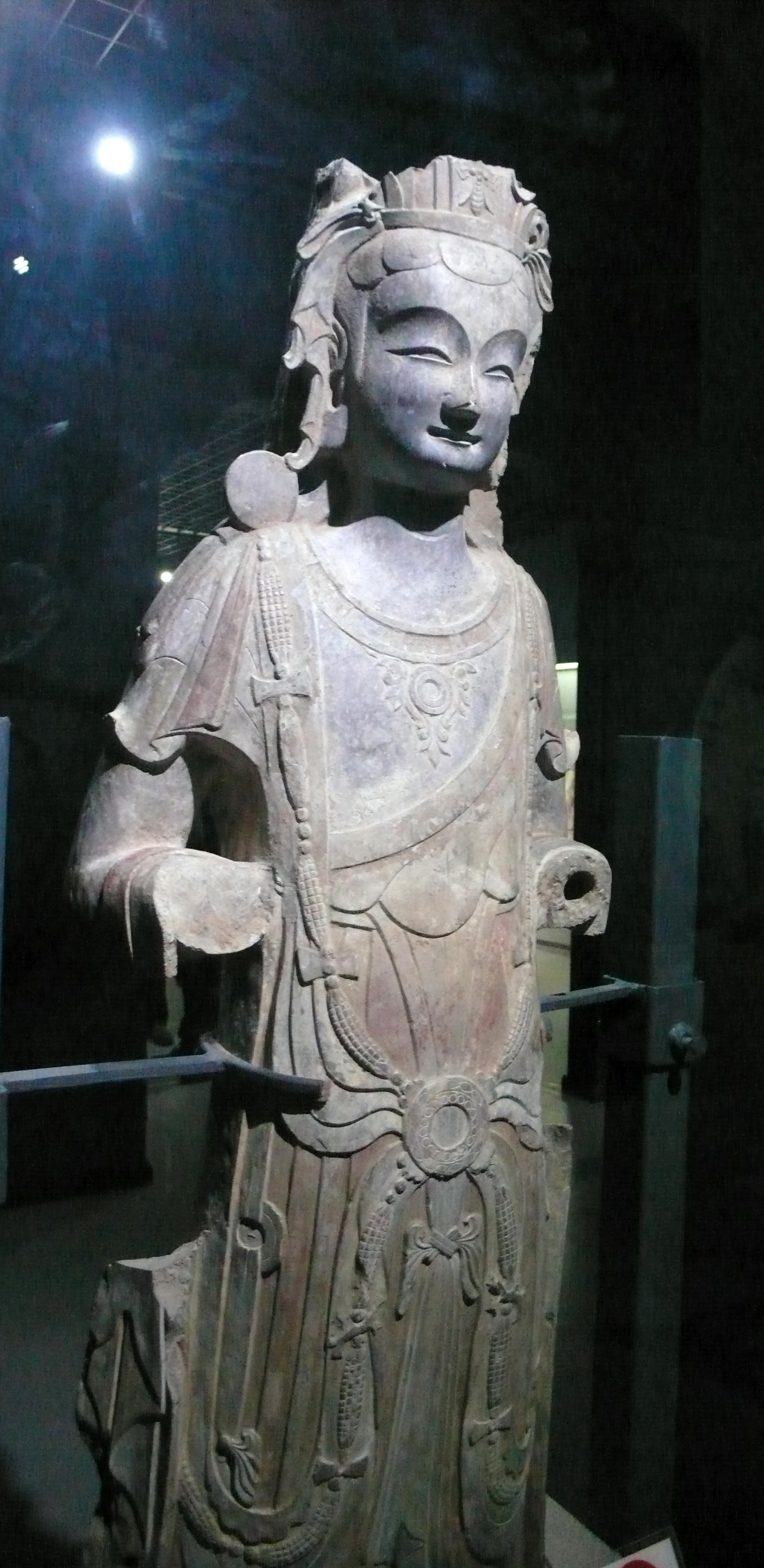
Statue from the Qingzhou Longxing Temple

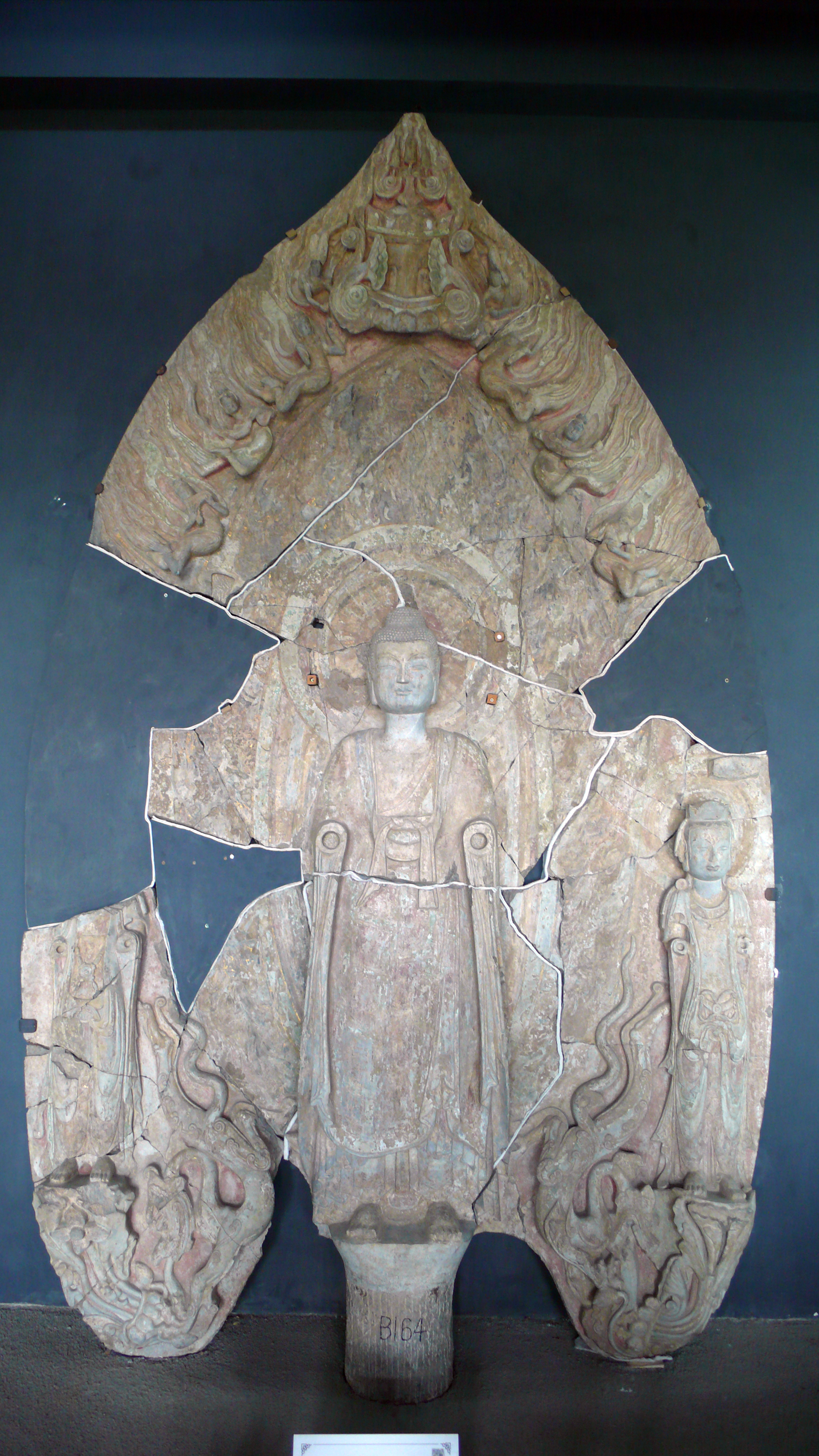
Statue from the Qingzhou Longxing Temple

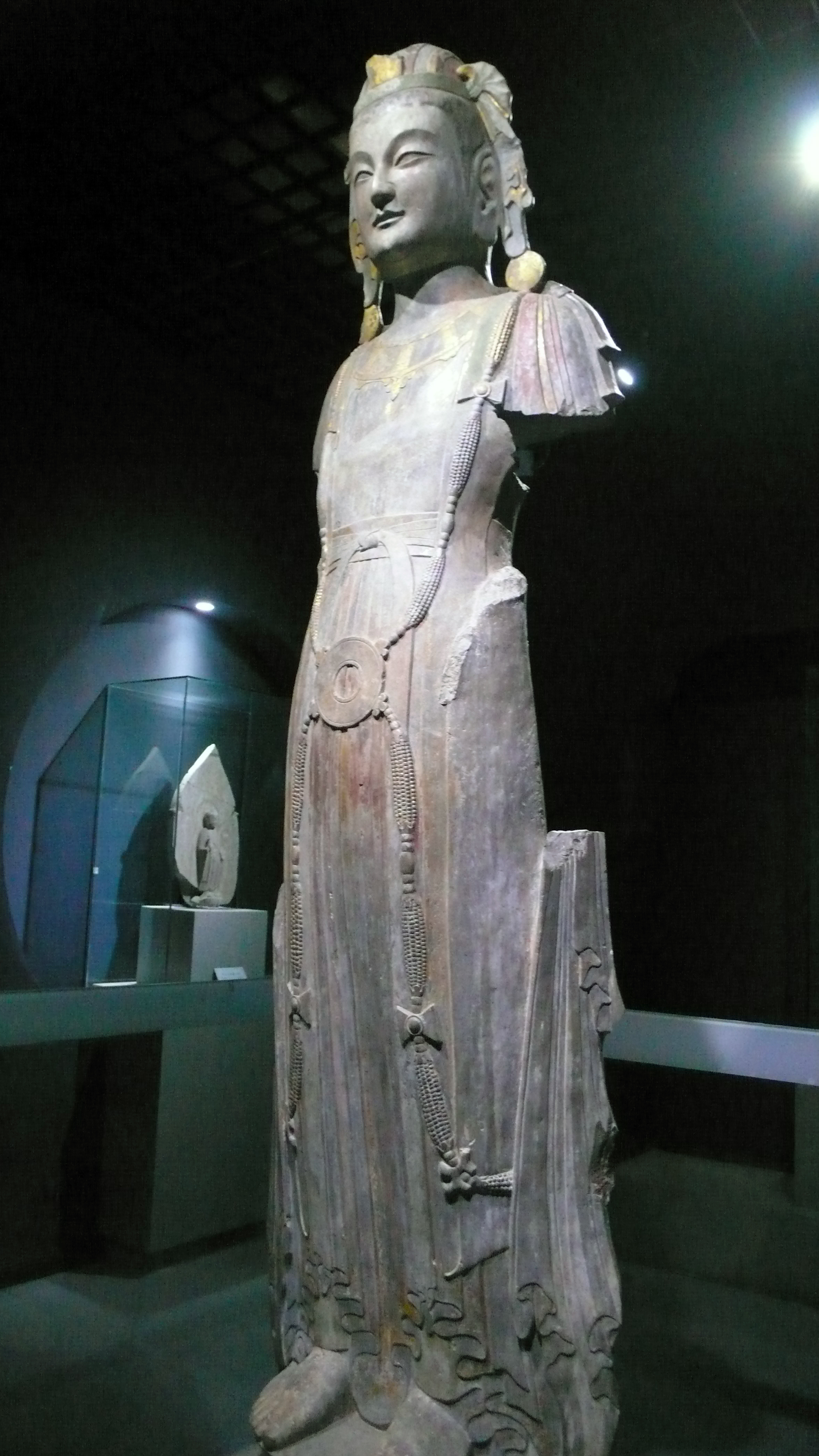
Statue from the Qingzhou Longxing Temple

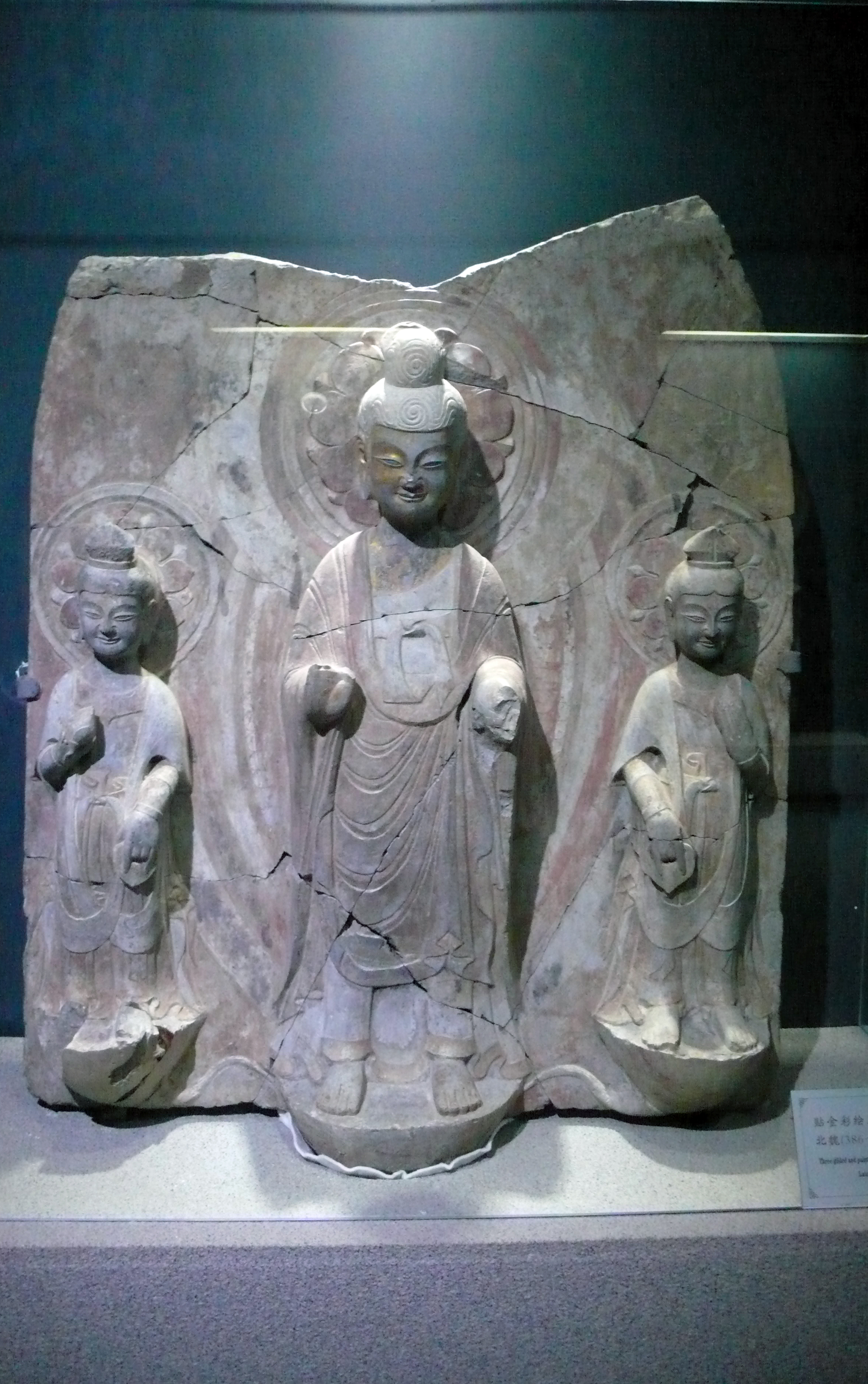
Statue from the Qingzhou Longxing Temple
