= Conservation Science in Cultural Heritage =

- Discipline: Conservation science
- Language: English, Italian
- Edited by: Salvatore Lorusso

Publication details
- Former name: Quaderni di Scienze della Conservazione
- History: 2001-present
- Publisher: University of Bologna (Italy)
- Frequency: Annually
- Open access: Yes
- License: Creative Commons Attribution 3.0 Unported License

Standard abbreviations
- ISO 4: Conserv. Sci. Cult. Herit.

Indexing
- ISSN: 1973-9494
- OCLC no.: 335442439
- Quaderni di Scienze della Conservazione
- ISSN: 1973-9486

Links
- Journal homepage; Online access; Online archive

Conservation Science in Cultural Heritage is a peer-reviewed open access academic journal. It is published by the Department of Cultural Heritage of the Alma Mater Studiorum, University of Bologna. Its scope is both historical and technical, covering conservation science for cultural heritage. Articles are in English and Italian, with summaries in English, French, German, Italian, Russian, Spanish, and Armenian.

The journal was established by professor Salvatore Lorusso, director of the Laboratory for Cultural Heritage in the Department of Cultural Heritage, in 2001, as Quaderni di Scienze della conservazione, and obtained its current name in 2007.

In 2012, the journal acquired class A status in the evaluation lists published by the "National Agency for the Evaluation of Universities and Research Institutes".

It is maintained by AlmaDL, digital library of the University of Bologna.

== Abstracting and indexing ==
The journal is abstracted and indexed by Art Abstracts and Omnifile.
