= Tongguan Kiln =

Archaeological site

Coordinates: 28°25′20.93″N 112°49′41.53″E

The Tongguan Kiln (simplified Chinese: 长沙铜官窑遗址; traditional Chinese: 長沙銅官窯遺址; pinyin: Chángshā Tóngguānyáo Yízhǐ), also called the Changsha Kiln, is located in Wazhaping (瓦渣坪), Tongguan Subdistrict, Changsha, Hunan, China. It is one of the major kiln sites in Tongguan to be protected at the national level. The place was a historical kiln site of potteries in the Tang (618–907 AD) and Five Dynasties periods (907–960 AD).

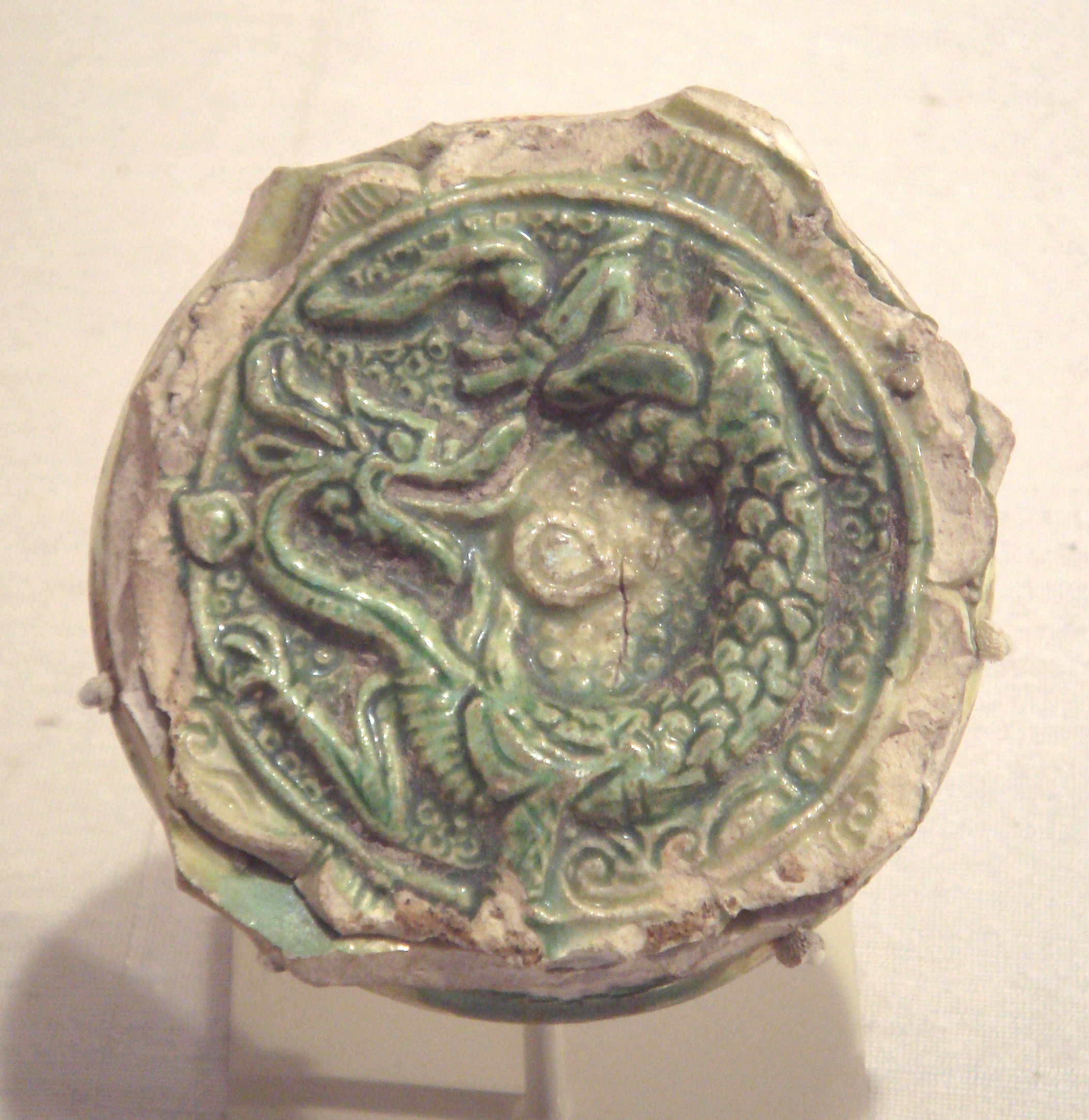
Tang dynasty earthenware fragment with sancai glaze, end of 7th-early 8th century, excavated in Nishapur, Iran.

The site covers about 68 hectares and found in 1956, it was the source place of underglaze by the Palace Museum's identification in 1957. The place was published one of the Major Historical and Cultural Sites Protected at the National Level by the State Council in January 1988, and was classified as one of the 100 Great Sites Protection Plan from 2006.
