= China's 100 major archaeological discoveries in the 20th century =

An inscribed oracle bone from Yinxu, which received the most votes in the poll

In 2001, the Institute of Archaeology of the Chinese Academy of Social Sciences organized a poll for China's 100 major archaeological discoveries in the 20th century (Chinese: 中国20世纪100项考古大发现). The participants included eight national-level institutions for archaeology and cultural relics, provincial-level archaeological institutes from 28 provinces, municipalities, and autonomous regions, as well as from Hong Kong, the archaeological departments of 11 major national universities, and many other scholars in Beijing. After three months and three rounds of voting, the results were announced on 29 March 2001 and were published in the journal Kaogu (Archaeology). In 2002, the Chinese Academy of Social Sciences Press published the book China's 100 Major Archaeological Discoveries in the 20th Century (二十世纪中国百项考古大发现), with more than 500 pages and 1,512 pictures.

Among all the candidates, the late-Shang dynasty capital Yinxu received the highest number of votes. Other sites that received high votes include Zhoukoudian, Banpo, Erlitou, Sanxingdui, Mausoleum of the First Qin Emperor and the Terracotta Army, Han dynasty Chang'an, Juyan Han ruins, the Yungang Grottoes, the Longmen Grottoes, the Dunhuang Grottoes, Luoyang of Sui–Tang dynasties, and the Dingling mausoleum.

Of the 100 discoveries selected, 51% were made by scientific initiative, whereas 31% were made accidentally and 10% were rescue archaeology. More than half of the academic discoveries were made in the Yellow River region, reflecting the traditional view, held by most archaeologists until the 1980s, that the Chinese civilization originated there. By contrast, other regions such as the Yangtze River valley accounted for two thirds of the accidental discoveries, typically found during construction.

== List by chronology ==
The 100 major archaeological discoveries selected include 7 discoveries from the Palaeolithic Age, 30 from the Neolithic Age, 23 from the Xia–Shang–Zhou era, 24 from the Qin and Han to the Northern and Southern dynasties, and 16 from the Sui–Tang and later dynasties. The list below is ordered chronologically, from the oldest to the most recent.

Palaeolithic Age

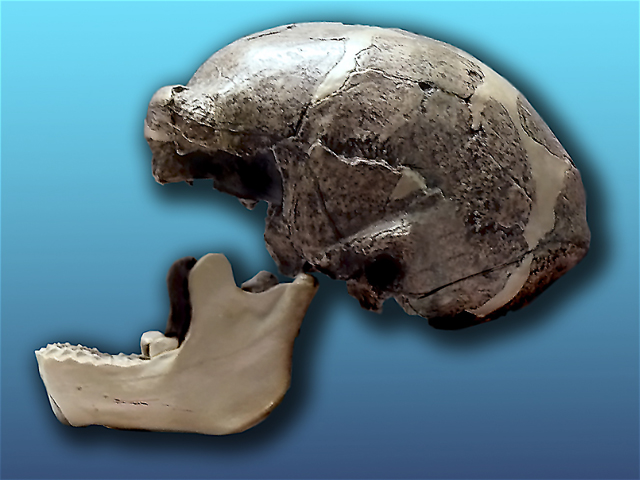
Peking Man skull (replica)

- 1. Zhoukoudian, the Peking Man, and the Upper Cave Man in Beijing
- 2. Yuanmou Man in Yunnan
- 3. Lantian Man in Shaanxi
- 4. Jinniushan and the Jinniushan Man in Yingkou, Liaoning
- 5. Maba Man, Qujiang, Guangdong
- 6. Nihewan site cluster in Yangyuan, Hebei
- 7. Dingcun in Xiangfen, Shanxi

Neolithic Age

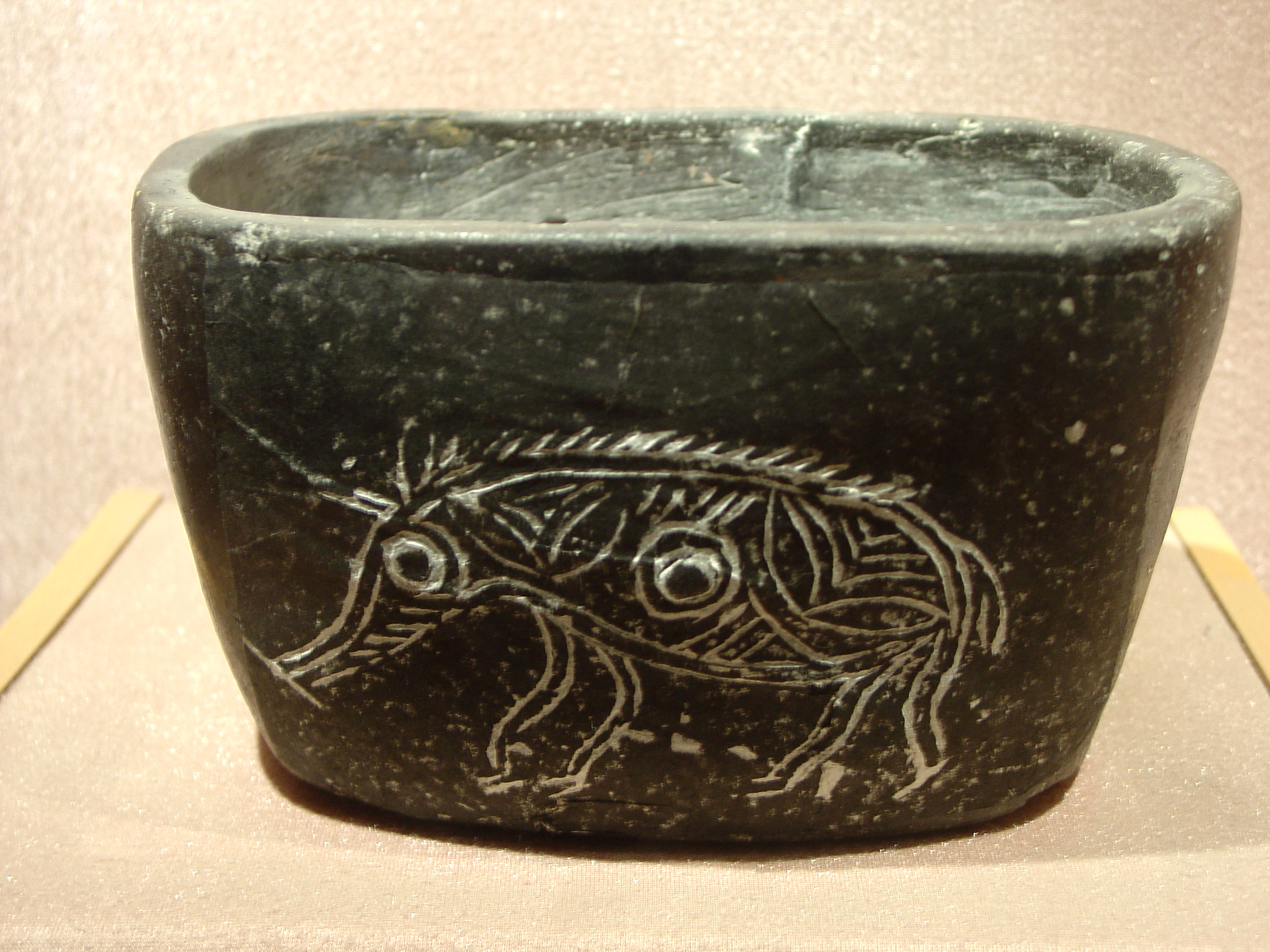
Pottery bowl with pig image, Hemudu culture

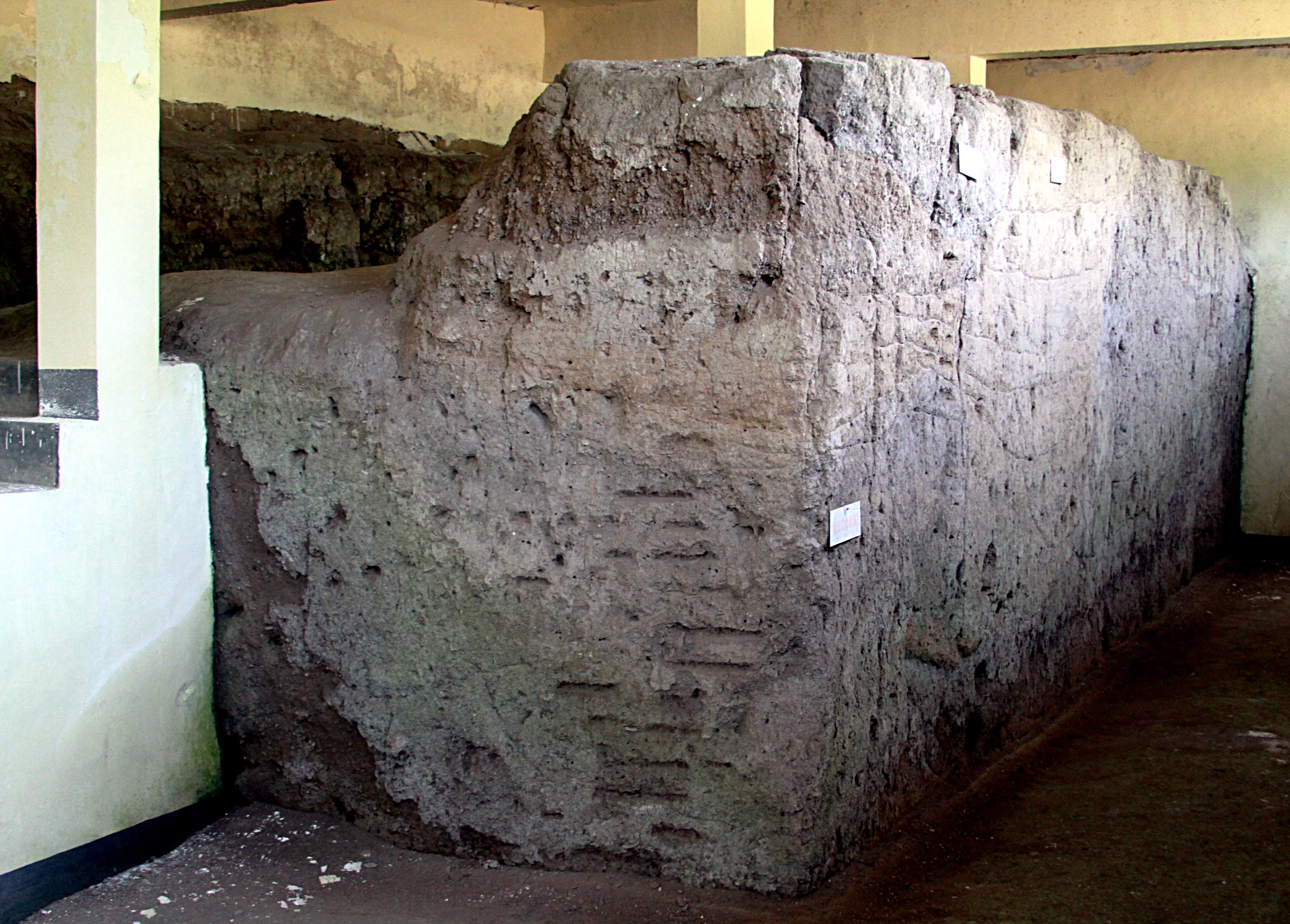
Neolithic city wall at Chengziya

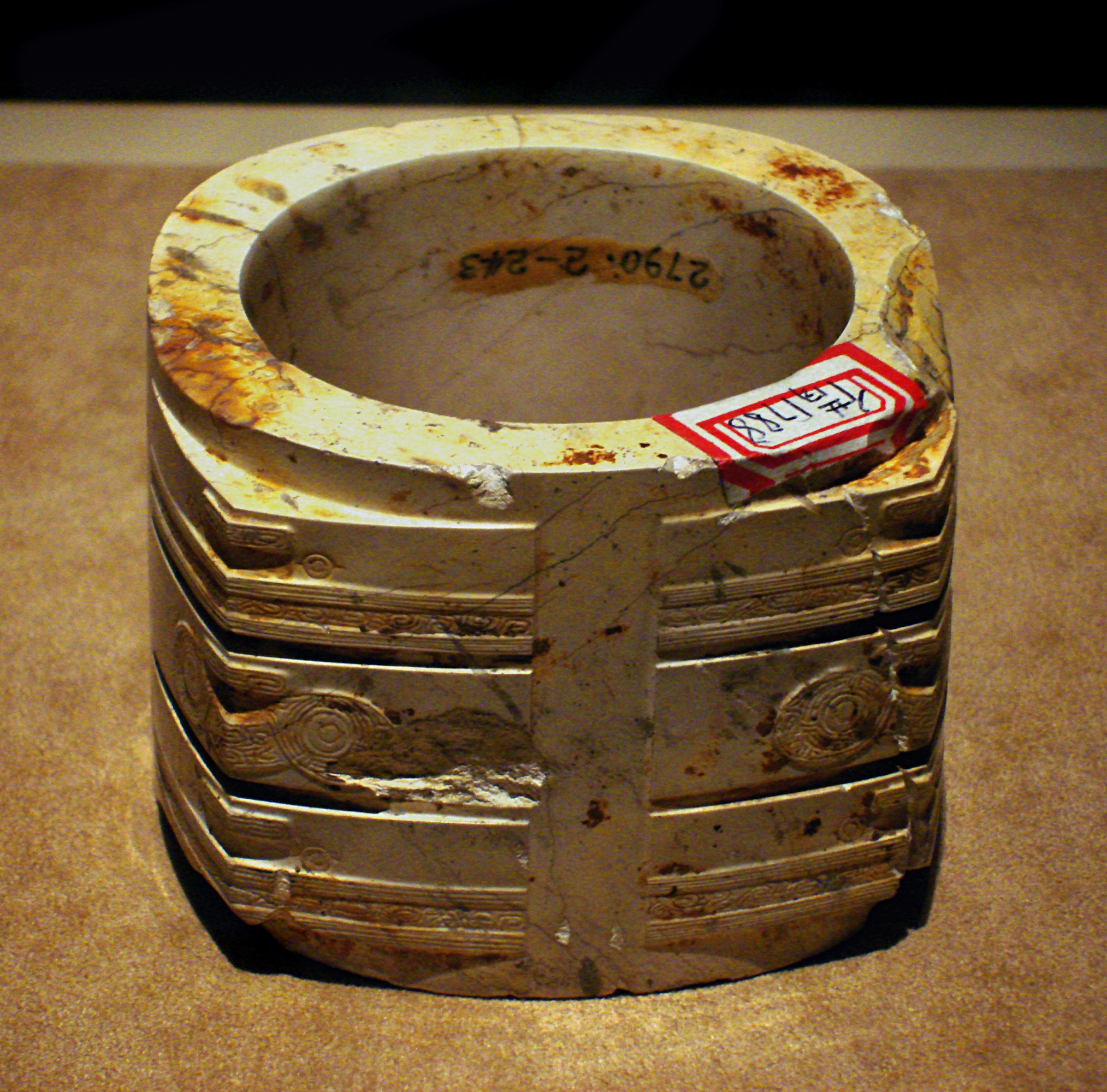
Jade cong of the Liangzhu culture

- 8. Xianren Cave and Diaotonghuan in Wannian, Jiangxi
- 9. Yuchanyan in Dao County, Hunan
- 10. Peiligang in Xinzheng, Henan
- 11. Jiahu in Wuyang County, Henan
- 12. Dadiwan in Qin'an, Gansu
- 13. Chengtoushan in Li County, Hunan
- 14. Xinglongwa in Chifeng, Liaoning
- 15. Yangshao in Mianchi, Henan
- 16. Banpo in Xi'an, Shaanxi
- 17. Jiangzhai in Lintong, Shaanxi
- 18. Hemudu in Yuyao, Zhejiang
- 19. Dawenkou in Tai'an, Shandong
- 20. Daxi in Wushan County, Chongqing
- 21. Qujialing in Jingshan County, Hubei
- 22. Hougang in Anyang, Henan
- 23. Miaodigou in Shanzhou, Henan
- 24. Wangchenggang Longshan culture site in Dengfeng, Henan
- 25. Songze in Shanghai
- 26. Chengziya Longshan culture site in Zhangqiu, Shandong
- 27. Liangzhu culture sites in Yuhang, Zhejiang
- 28. Shijiahe culture sites in Tianmen, Hubei
- 29. Majiayao culture sites in Lintao, Gansu
- 30. Liuwan cemeteries (Neolithic to Bronze Age) in Ledu, Qinghai
- 31. Hongshan culture sites in Lingyuan and Jianping County, Liaoning
- 32. Karuo culture sites in Chamdo, Tibet
- 33. Shixia culture sites in Qujiang, Guangdong
- 34. Taosi Longshan culture site in Xiangfen, Shanxi
- 35. Tung Wan Tsai North in Ma Wan, Hong Kong
- 36. Yuanshan in Taipei, Taiwan

Xia, Shang, and Zhou

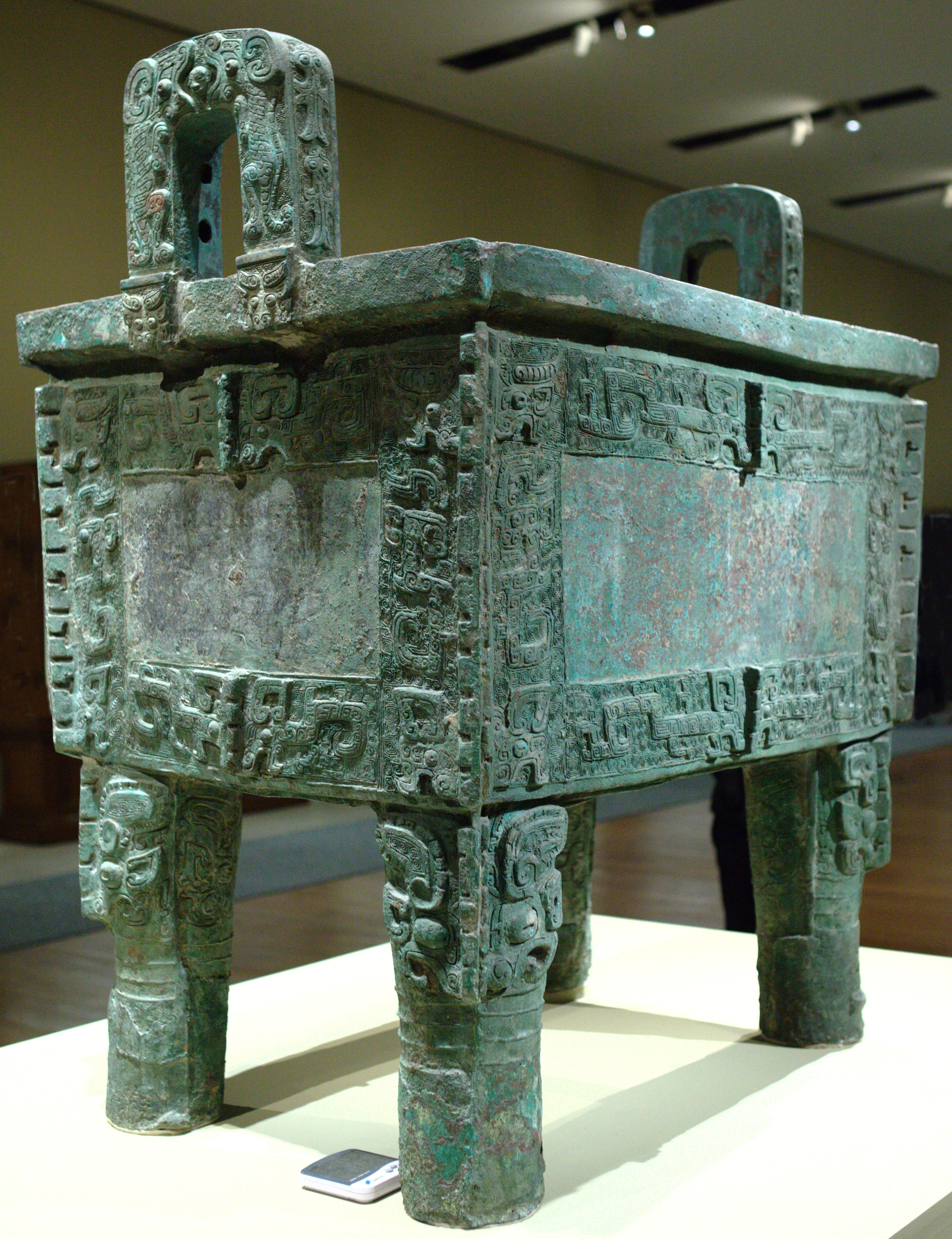
Houmuwu ding from Yinxu

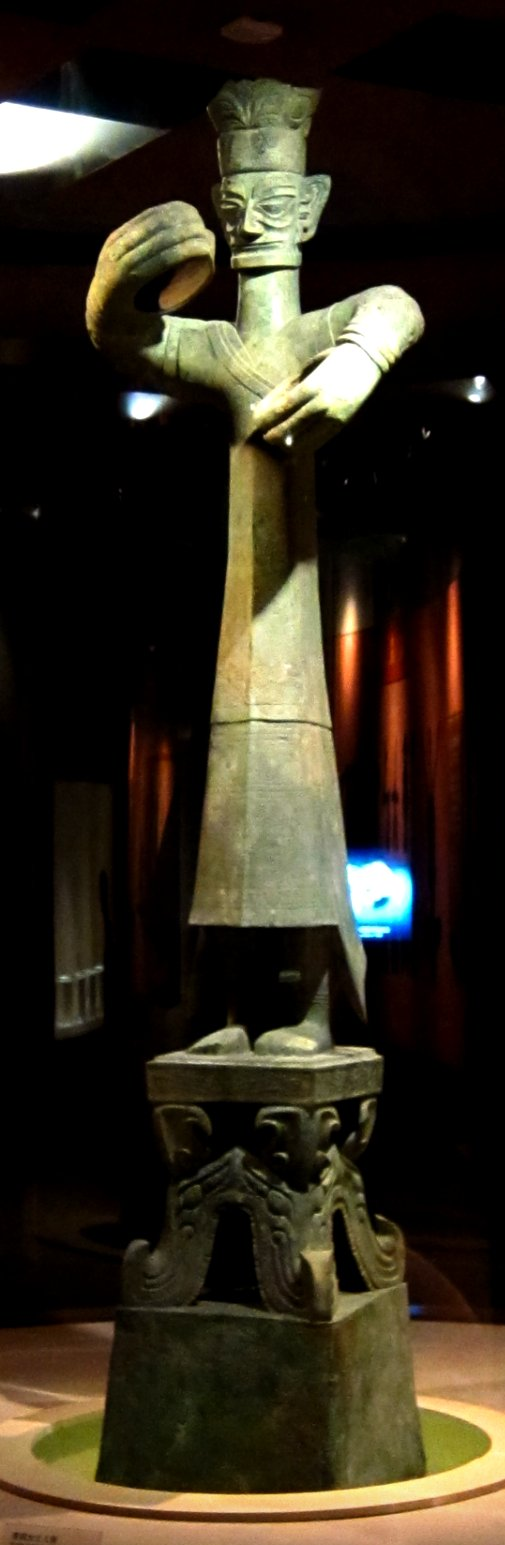
Bronze figure from Sanxingdui

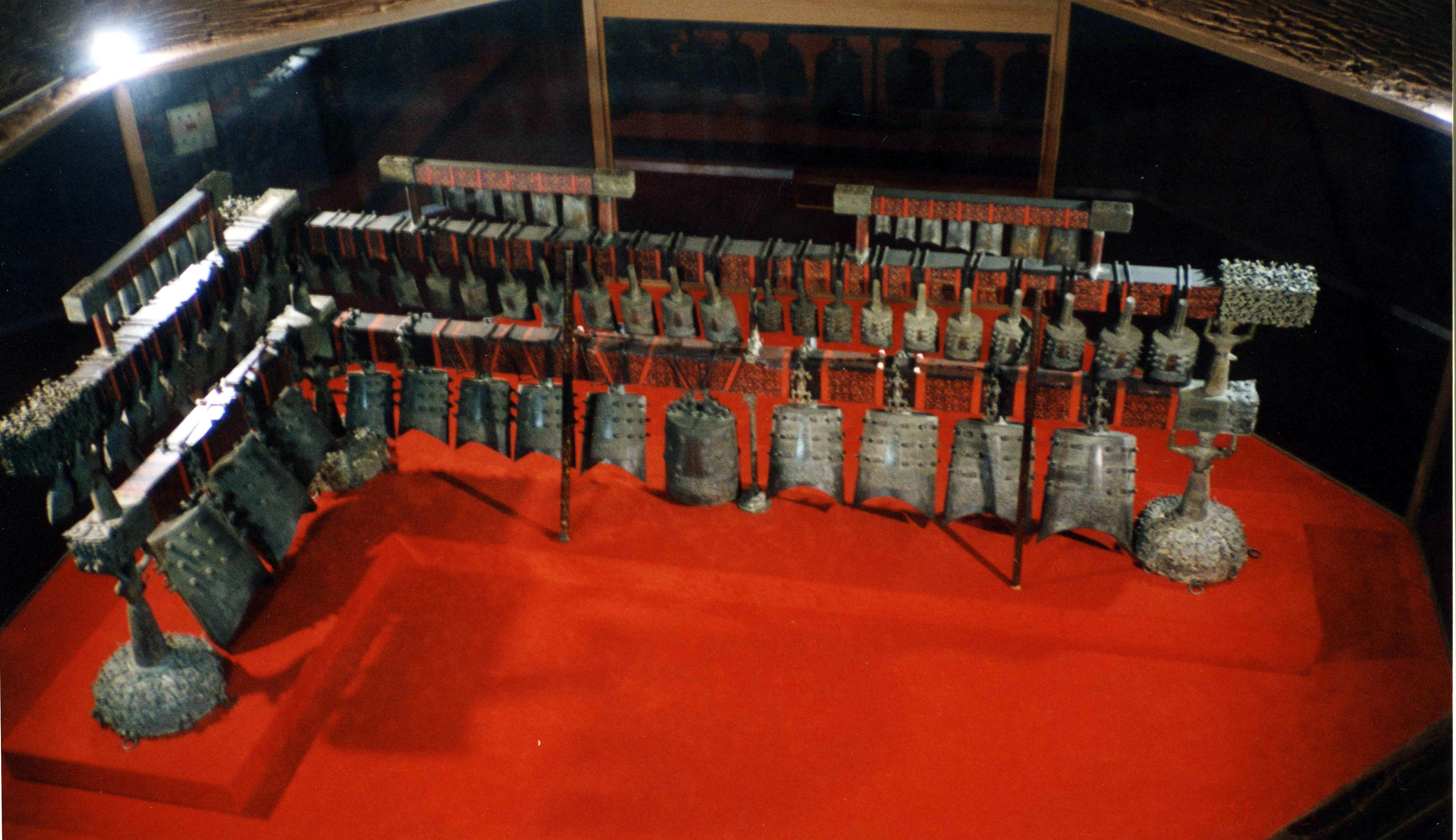
Bronze bianzhong from the Tomb of Marquis Yi of Zeng

- 37. Qijiaping Qijia culture site in Guanghe County, Gansu
- 38. Erlitou site in Yanshi, Henan
- 39. Dongxiafeng Erlitou culture site in Xia County, Shanxi
- 40. Xiajiadian early Bronze Age site in Chifeng, Inner Mongolia
- 41. Dadianzi Lower Xiajiadian culture site in Aohan Banner, Inner Mongolia
- 42. Yanshi Shang City in Yanshi, Henan
- 43. Zhengzhou Shang City in Zhengzhou, Henan
- 44. Panlongcheng, Shang dynasty city in Huangpi, Hubei
- 45. Yinxu, late-Shang dynasty capital in Anyang, Henan
- 46. Wucheng culture site in Zhangshu, Jiangxi
- 47. Xingan late-Shang tomb in Xingan, Jiangxi
- 48. Sanxingdui in Guanghan, Sichuan
- 49. Zhouyuan Western Zhou site in Shaanxi
- 50. Fenghao, capital of Western Zhou in Shaanxi
- 51. Liulihe site, Yan state capital and cemetery in Beijing
- 52. Jin state cemetery in Quwo, Shanxi
- 53. Shangyang city, capital of Guo and cemetery in Sanmenxia, Henan
- 54. Jin state capital in Houma, Shanxi
- 55. Zheng–Han City in Xinzheng, Henan
- 56. Lower Capital of Yan in Yi County, Hebei
- 57. Tomb of Marquis Yi of Zeng, Sui County, Hubei
- 58. Jinancheng, capital of Chu in Jiangling County, Hubei
- 59. Tomb of King Cuo of Zhongshan in Pingshan County, Hebei
- 60. Tonglüshan mining site, Hubei

Qin, Han, Wei, Jin, and Northern and Southern Dynasties

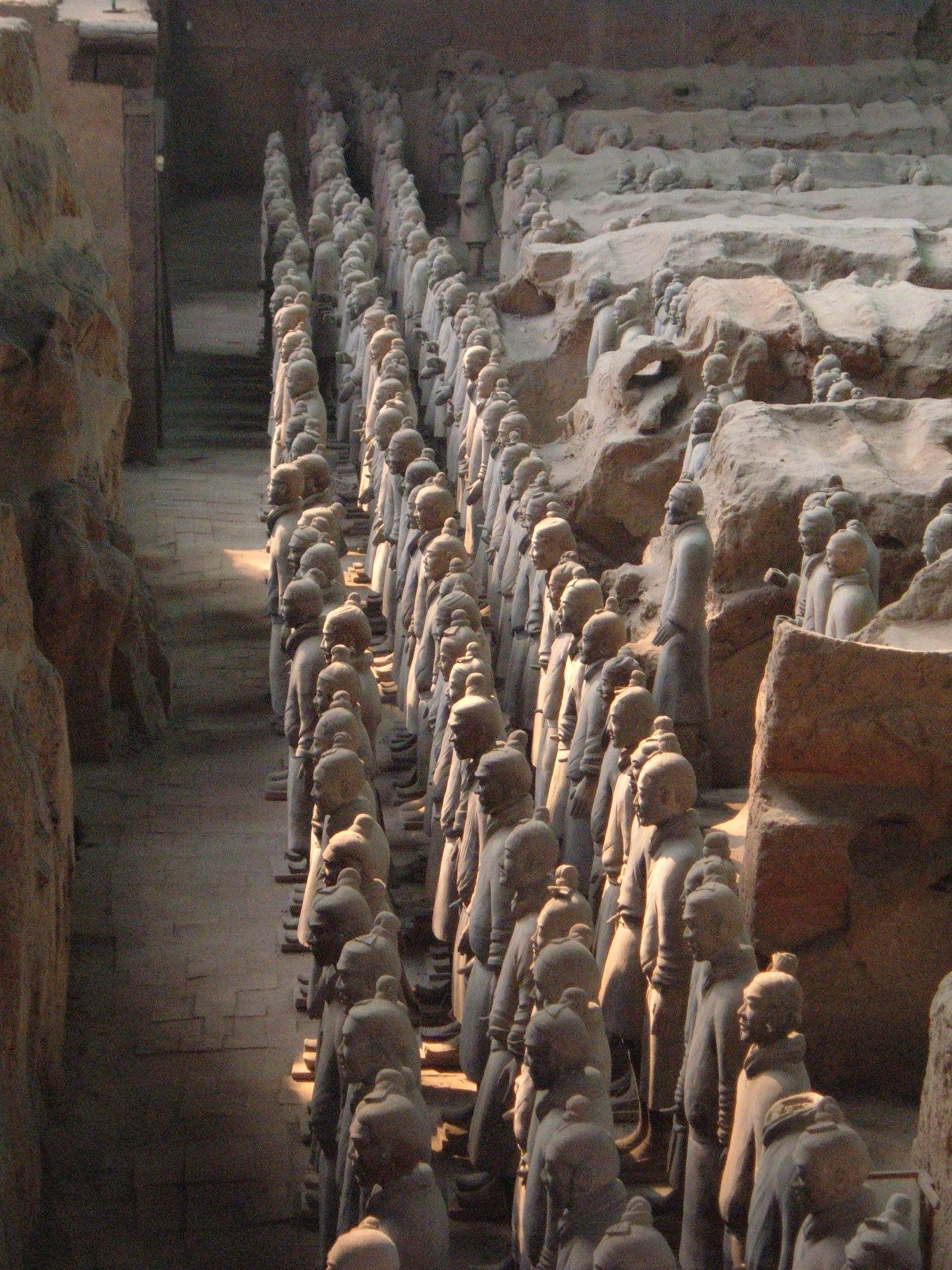
Terracotta Army of the Mausoleum of the First Qin Emperor

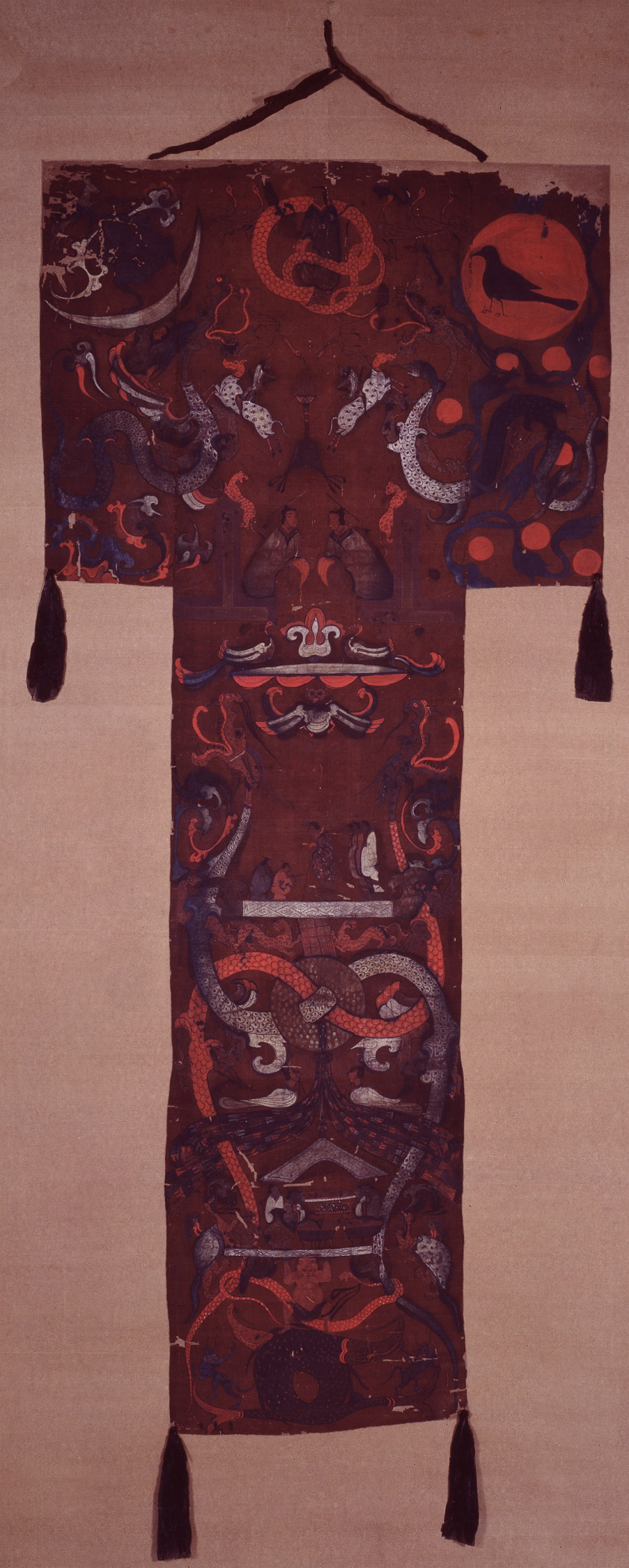
2nd-century BC silk painting from Mawangdui

- 61. Qin capital Xianyang and palaces, Shaanxi
- 62. Mausoleum of the First Qin Emperor and the Terracotta Army, Lintong, Shaanxi
- 63. Shuihudi and Longgang Qin tombs, Yunmeng, Hubei
- 64. Chang'an of Han dynasty, Xi'an, Shaanxi
- 65. Western Han dynasty imperial tombs, Shaanxi
- 66. Mancheng Han tombs, Hebei
- 67. Mausoleums of Han dynasty Kings of Chu, Xuzhou, Jiangsu
- 68. Mawangdui Han tombs, Hunan
- 69. Mausoleum of the Nanyue King, Guangzhou, Guangdong
- 70. Yinqueshan Han tombs, Linyi, Shandong
- 71. Shaogou Han tombs, Luoyang, Henan
- 72. Shizhaishan cemetery for the kings and nobles of Dian, Jinning, Yunnan
- 73. Juyan Han ruins and slips, Inner Mongolia
- 74. Han–Wei Luoyang, Luoyang, Henan
- 75. Capital of the Loulan Kingdom, Xinjiang
- 76. Niya in Minfeng County, Xinjiang
- 77. Yecheng, Linzhang, Hebei
- 78. Zoumalou bamboo slips, Changsha, Hunan
- 79. Southern dynasties tombs in Nanjing, Jiangsu
- 80. Yungang Grottoes, Datong, Shanxi
- 81. Longmen Grottoes, Luoyang, Henan
- 82. Koguryo tombs in Ji'an, Jilin
- 83. Mogao Caves, Dunhuang, Gansu
- 84. Longxing Temple hoard of Buddhist statues, Qingzhou, Shandong

Sui, Tang, and later dynasties

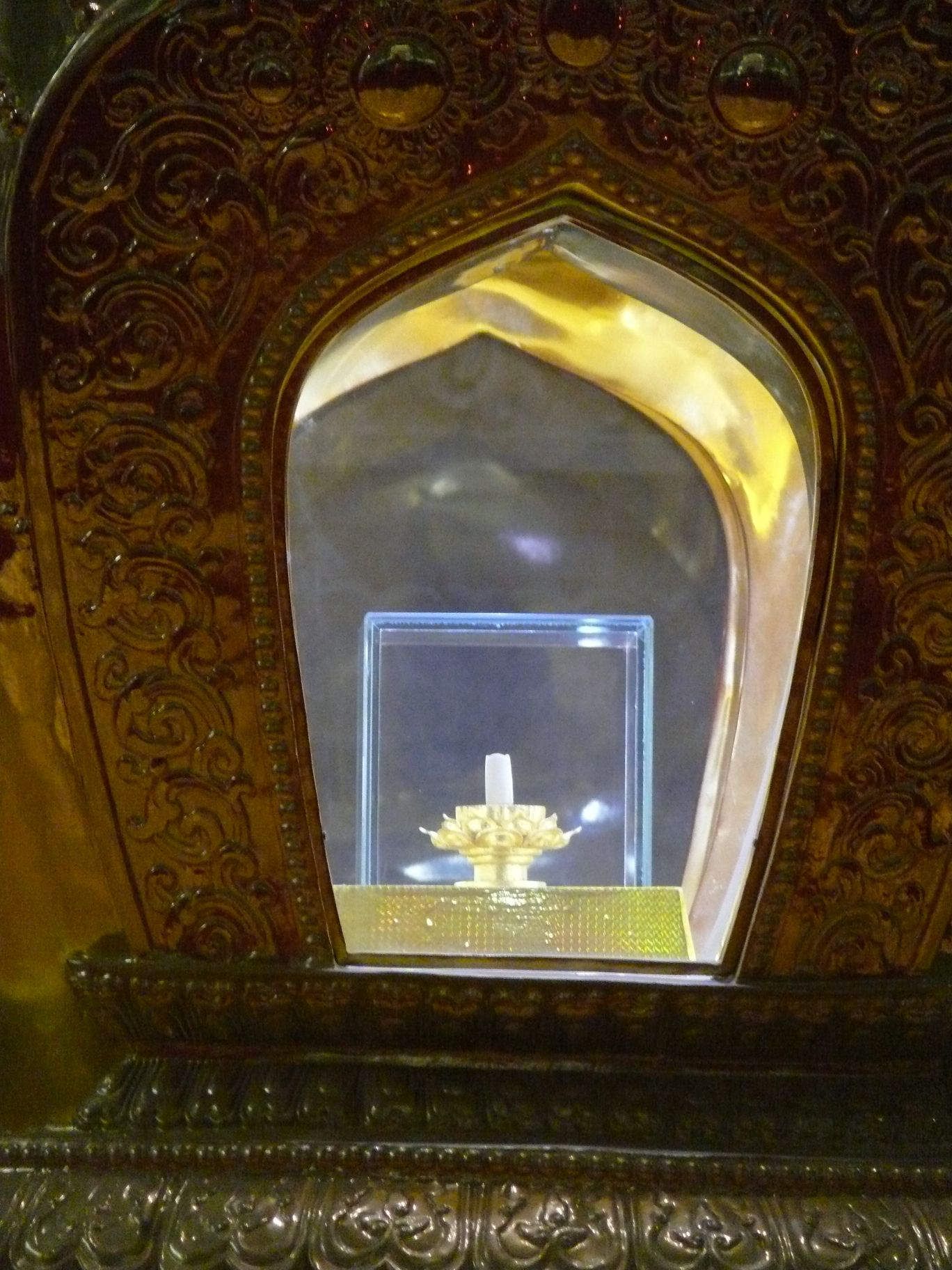
Buddha's relic from the pagoda base of the Famen Temple

- 85. Daxing–Chang'an City, capital of the Sui and Tang dynasties, Xi'an, Shaanxi
- 86. Sui–Tang Luoyang and Song dynasty government sites, Luoyang, Henan
- 87. Yu Hong tomb of the Sui dynasty, Taiyuan, Shanxi
- 88. Subsidiary tombs of Tang dynasty imperial mausoleums, Shaanxi
- 89. Famen Temple pagoda base, Fufeng, Shaanxi
- 90. Astana Cemetery and documents, Turpan, Xinjiang
- 91. Shangjing Longquanfu, Ning'an, Heilongjiang
- 92. Two imperial mausoleums of the Southern Tang dynasty, Nanjing, Jiangsu
- 93. Tomb of the Liao dynasty Princess of Chen, Naiman Banner, Inner Mongolia
- 94. Baisha Song tombs, Yu County, Henan
- 95. Western Xia mausoleums, Yinchuan, Ningxia
- 96. Longquan Kiln of the Southern Song dynasty, Zhejiang
- 97. Yaozhou Kiln, Tongchuan, Shaanxi
- 98. Capital of the Guge Kingdom, Tibet
- 99. Dadu, capital of the Yuan dynasty, Beijing
- 100. Dingling mausoleum, Beijing

== See also ==
- National archaeological park of China
