= Lingjiatan culture =

Neolithic culture of China

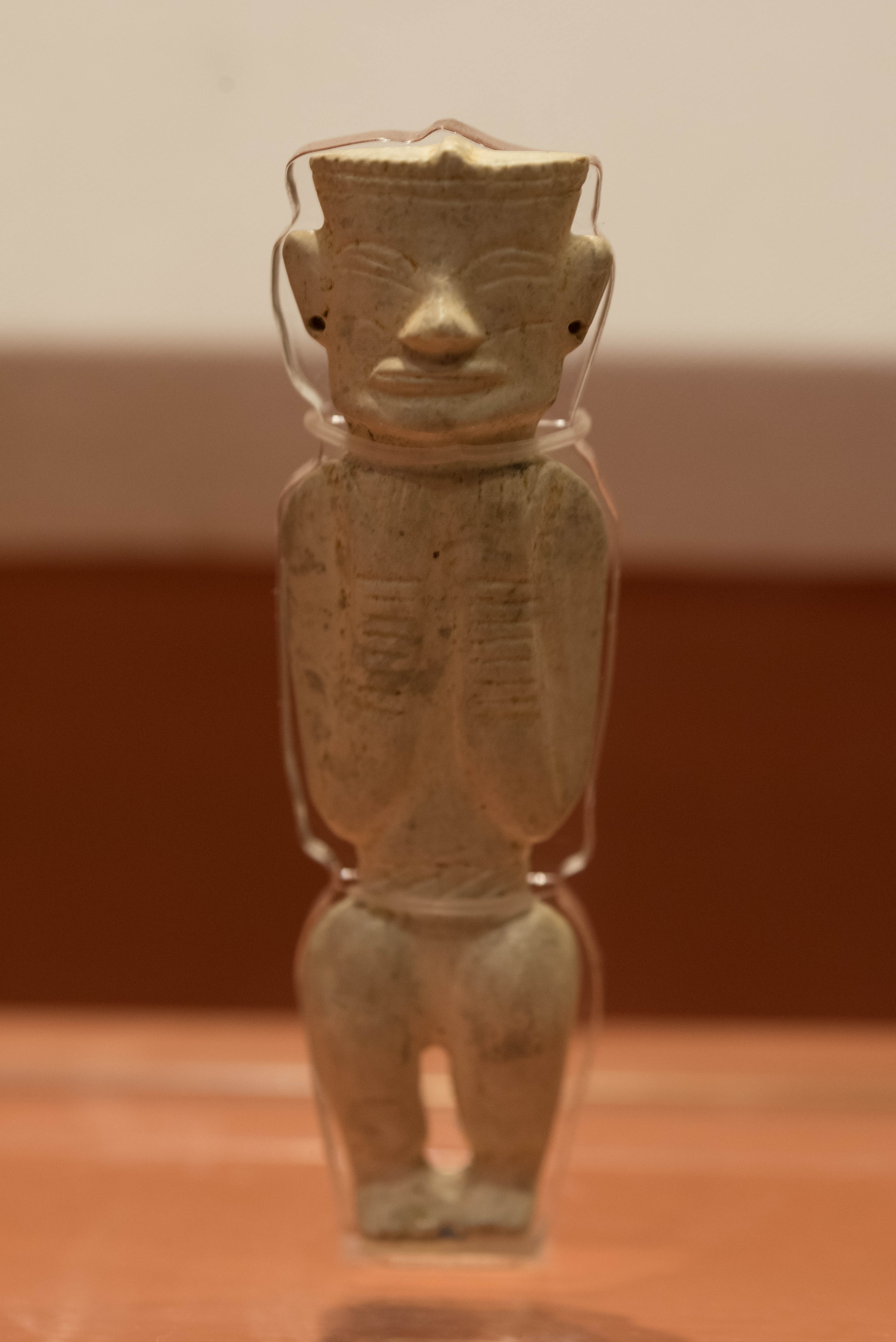
Jade human figure at Lingjiatan Site

The Lingjiatan culture (Ch:凌家滩, 3800–3300 BCE) is a Late Neolithic culture of China, in the area of the Lower Yangtze and Huai in Anhui. It is famous for its jade statuettes, which adopted the styles of the Hongshan culture.

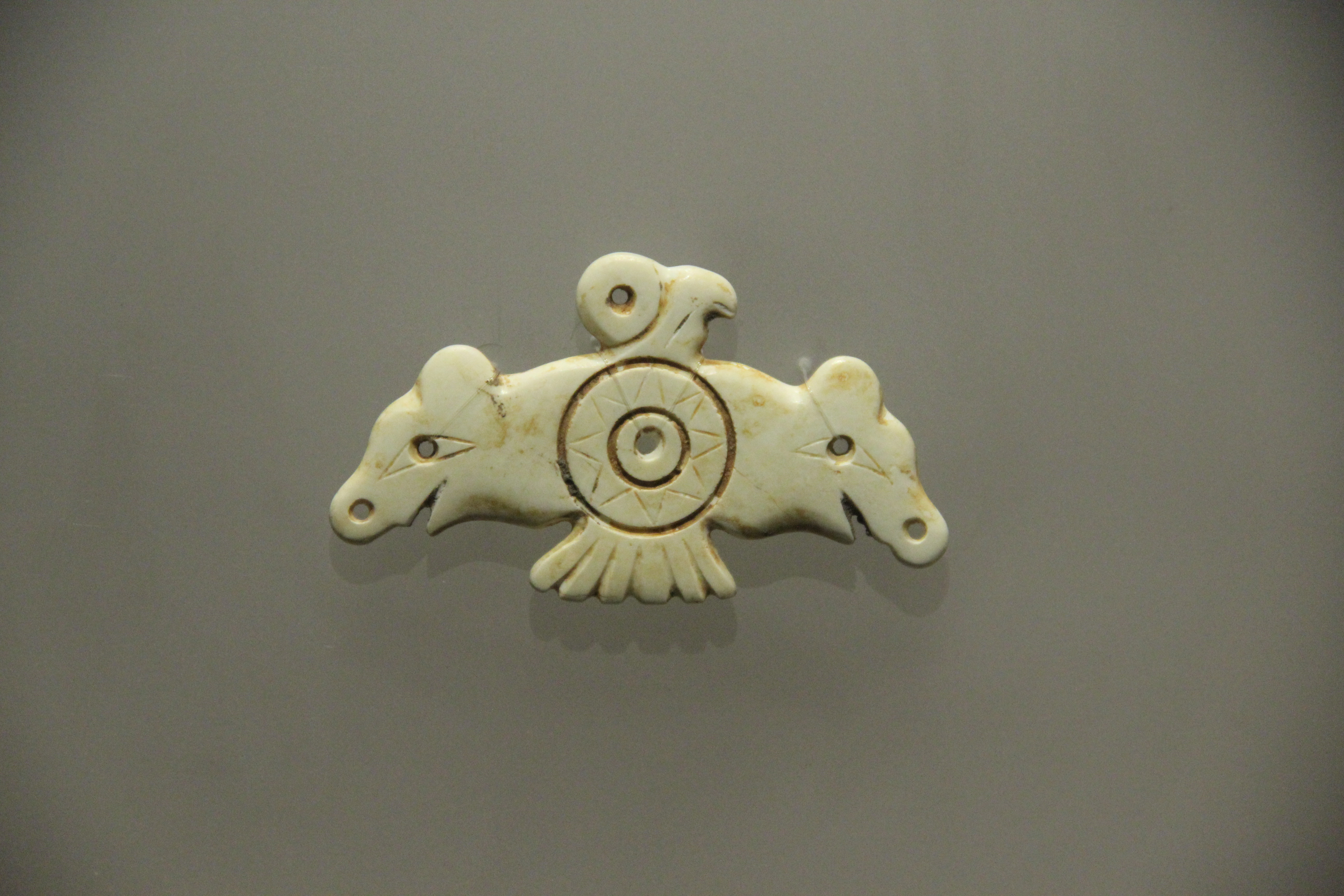
Lingjiatian boar-bird from tomb 98M29.

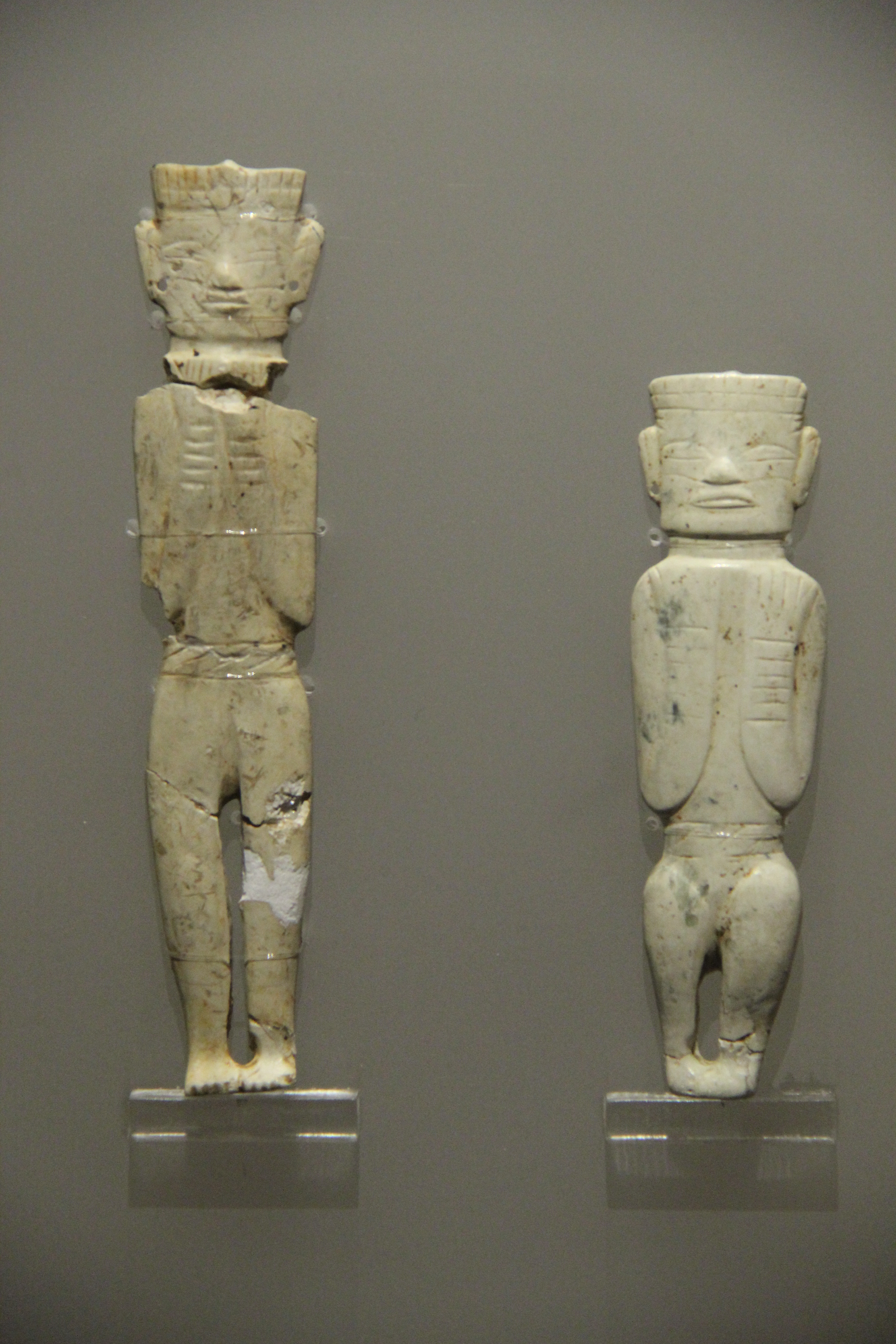
Lingjiatian jade statuettes.
