= Zengpiyan =

Cave and archaeological site in China

- 甑皮岩 (Chinese)
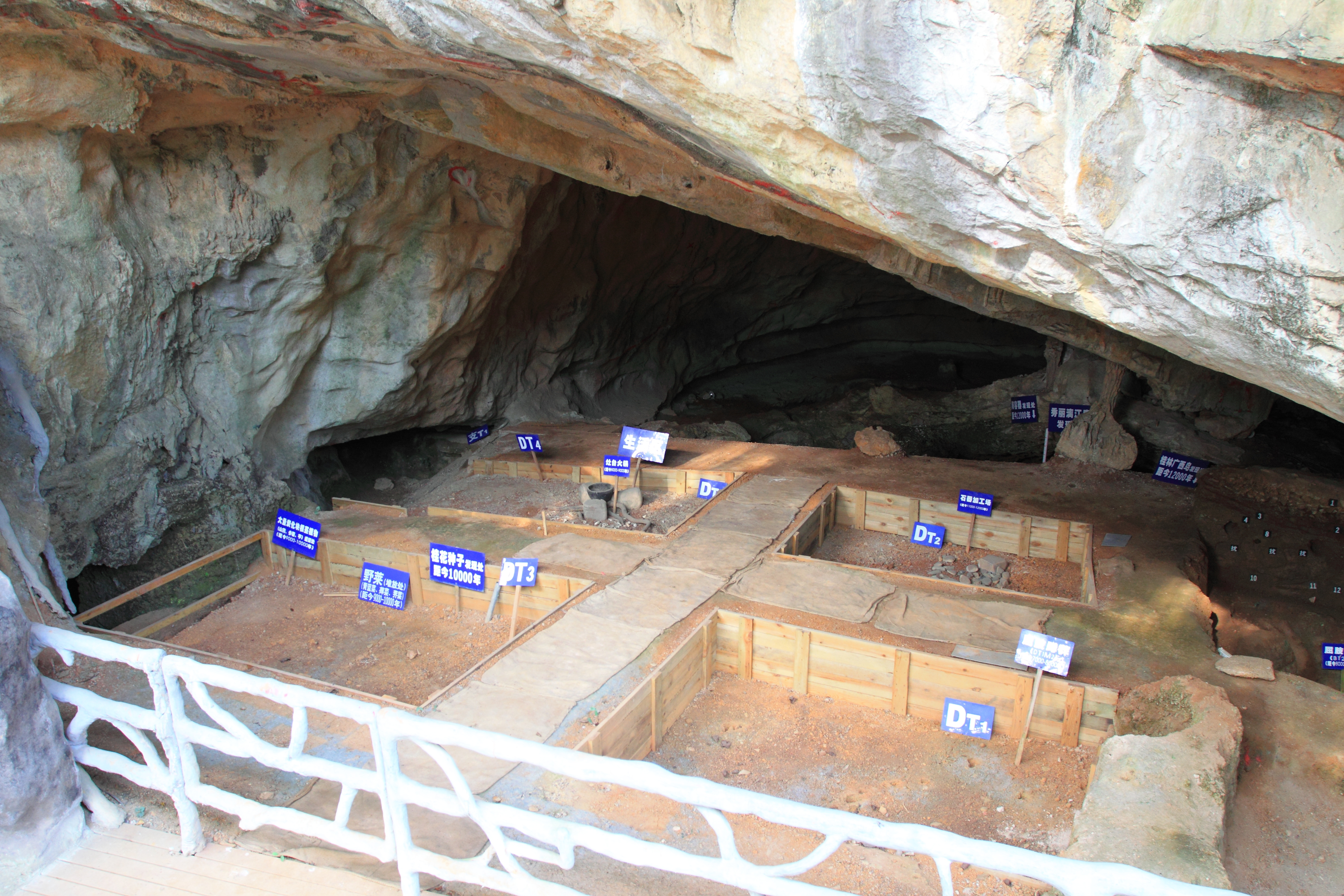

- Location of Zengpiyan Zengpiyan (China)
- 25°12′56″N 110°16′40″E
- Type: Archaeological site
- Periods: Neolithic
- Associated with: Palaeo-humans
- Location: Guilin, Guangxi, China

History
- Built: c. 10,000 BC
- Abandoned: c. 5000 BC

Site notes
- Material: limestone Karst
- Elevation: 154 m (505 ft)
- Area: 400 m^{2} (4,306 sq ft)
- Excavation dates: 1973
- Archaeologists: Fu Xianguo
- Discovered: 1969

Zengpiyan (Chinese: 甑皮岩; pinyin: Zèngpíyán) is a Neolithic cave site in southern China. It is located in the Guilin region on the south-western fringes of the Dushan Mountain (Dú Shān 独山) in the autonomous region Guangxi and is considered to be one of the most important cave sites of the Neolithic in China as it is one of the many independent centers for the introduction of animal domestication and pottery.

The cave was discovered in 1969 and archaeological excavations began in 1973. Dating revealed that the cave was occupied between 10,000 and 5000 BC. This natural cave was used as a dwelling place, though whether it was only a seasonal habitat is not yet clear. The main cave has an area of approximately 220 m^{2} (2,368 sq ft) and faces southwest, adjacent to the Li River with neighboring woods for hunting, lakes for fishing and plains for collecting wild vegetables.

Excavations have so far yielded the remains of over 30 human individuals, 110 kinds of mammals, birds, fishes and reptiles, over 1,000 pieces of polished and pierced stone and bone ware, animal teeth, mussel shells and over 10,000 pieces of pottery. Many fireplaces and waste pits were also discovered. In the back of the cave stone material is piled up. In older sediments semi-finished stone tools were abundant. Pierced stone tools and polished stone tools were unearthed from more recent layers. Bone artifacts included fishing spears (Yubiao 鱼镖), arrowheads (zú 镞) needles (zhēn 针) and hairpins (jī 笄).

The cave yielded some of the country's oldest pieces of pottery, as the appearance of pottery in the area is believed to be related to freshwater snail eating. "Freshwater snails were one of their staple foods, judging by the quantities of snail shells found in various strata". The oldest local pottery is according to Chinese archaeologists dated to 12,000 years BP. The ceramics of more recent strata were determined to belong to the "String pattern-Guan-vessel-type" (绳纹罐类).

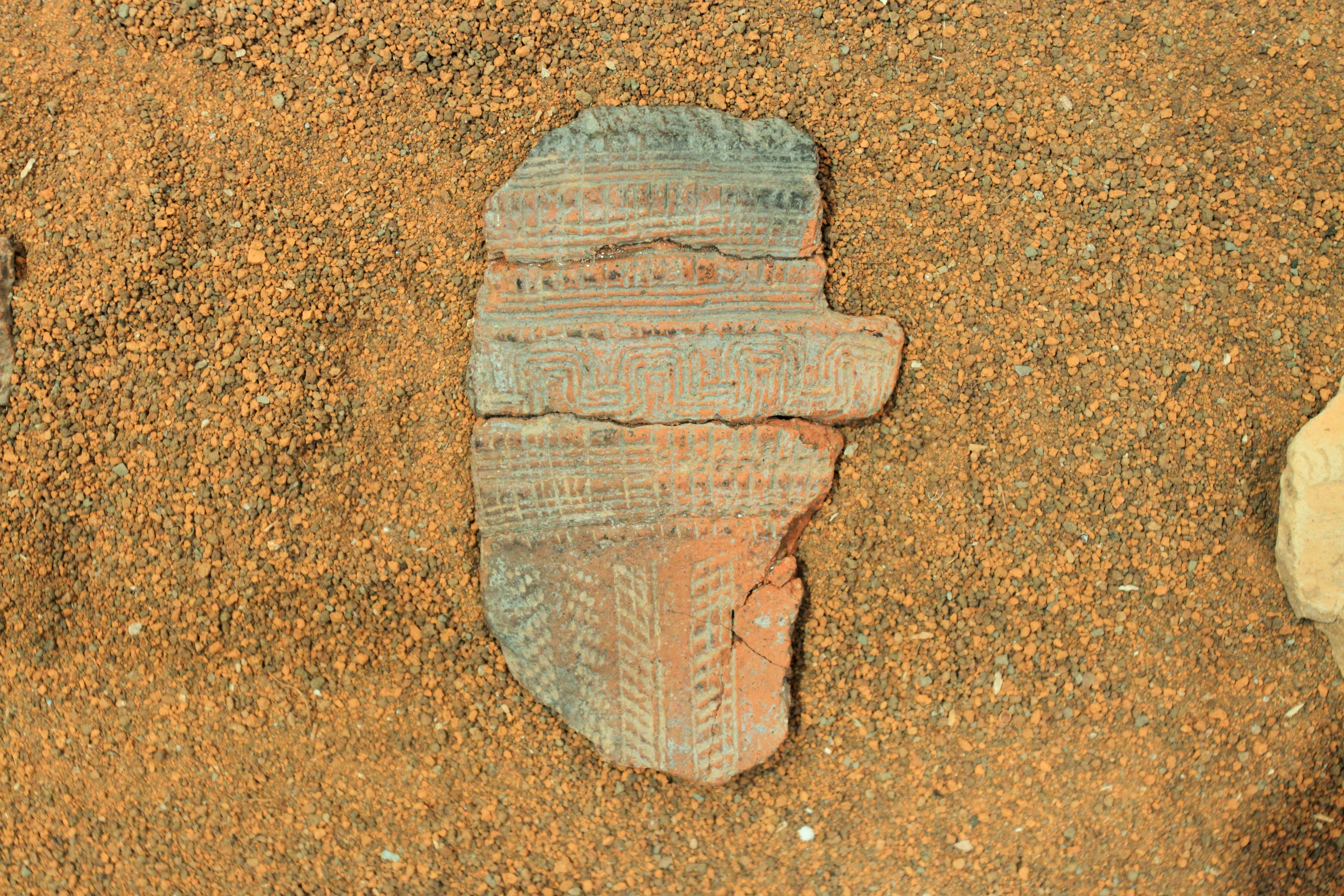
Pottery fragment from the site

For some time the cave must also have served as a primitive tomb as bones of about 30 humans were discovered. No burial pits and funeral tools have been found. The bodies were buried mainly in a squatting position.

The cave was finally abandoned after being inhabited for 5,000 years when a warm and humid period started around 5000 BC and the cave, only one meter above the surrounding plain, was often flooded.

The assertion that the pig was domesticated at this site remains controversial and has not yet been answered conclusively.

scholars Zhang Chia and Hsiao-chun Hung in "Later hunter-gatherers in southern China, 18,000–3000 BC":

"The ‘Neolithic package’ doesn't really work for this fascinating chapter of the human experience, where pottery, social aggregation, animal domestication and rice cultivation all arrive at different places and times. The authors define the role of the ‘pottery-using foragers’, sophisticated hunter-gatherers who left shell or fish middens in caves and dunes. These colonising non-farmers shared numerous cultural attributes with rice cultivators on the Yangtze, their parallel contemporaries over more than 5000 years. Some agriculturalists became hunter-foragers in turn when they expanded onto less fertile soils. No simple linear transition then, but the practice of ingenious strategies, adaptations and links in a big varied land."

Zengpiyan has been listed as a monument of China in 2001.
