= Kawada =

Kawada (川田 or 河田), also read as Kawata, is a common Japanese surname. Notable people with the surname include:

- Atsuko Kawada (born 1965), Japanese actress
- Jun Kawada, poet
- Junko Kawada (born 1974), J-pop singer
- Kohei Kawata (河田 晃兵; born 1987), Japanese footballer
- Mami Kawada, J-pop singer
- Ryuhei Kawada (born 1976), Haemophiliac and member of the House of Councillors
- Shinji Kawada (born 1971), Japanese voice actor
- Toshiaki Kawada (born 1963), Japanese professional wrestler
- Kazuhiro Kawata (born 1982), Japanese football player
- Satoshi Kawata (born 1951), Japanese nanotechnologist
- Taeko Kawata (born 1965), Japanese voice actress
- Taizo Kawada (1944–2026), Japanese golf critic and designer
- Kikuji Kawada (born 1933), Japanese photographer
- Yuki Kawata (河田 悠希; born 1997), Japanese archer
- Yukiyosi Kawada, Japanese mathematician

== Fictional characters ==
- Noriko Kawada, a character in Digimon Adventure
- Shogo Kawada, a character in Battle Royale

== See also ==
- Kawada, Gunma, Japan
