= Karthalipalem =

- Village
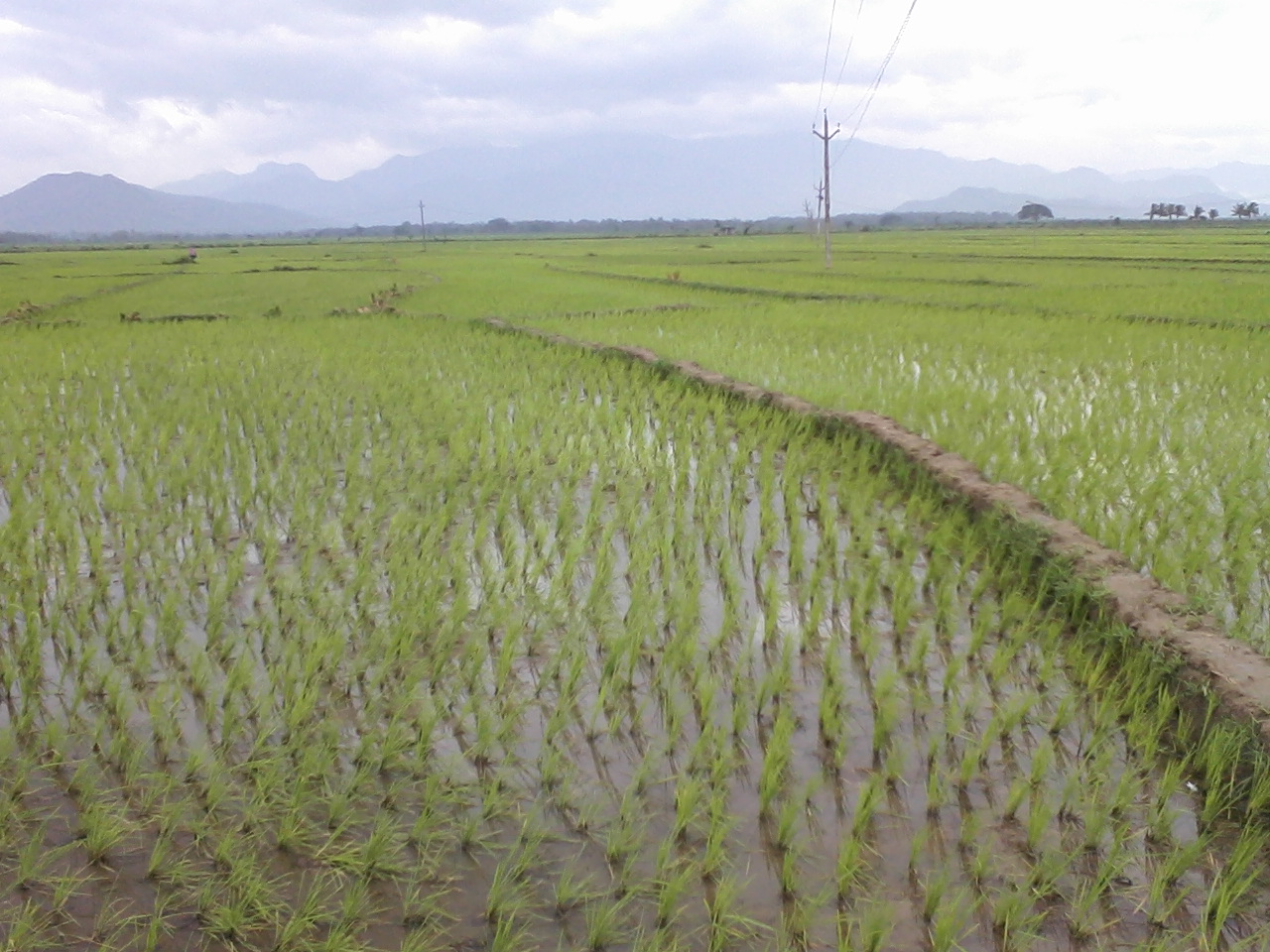
- Karthalipalem paddy fields background with Mahendragiri hills
- Interactive map of Karthalipalem
- Location in Andhra Pradesh, India Karthalipalem (India)
- Coordinates: 18.890212°N 84.527550°E
- Country: India
- State: Andhra Pradesh
- District: Srikakulam

Government
  - Type: Gram Panchayat

Area
  - Total: 6.03 km^{2} (2.33 sq mi)
- Elevation: 14 m (46 ft)

Population
  - Total: 2,853
  - Density: 473/km^{2} (1,230/sq mi)

Languages
  - Official: Telugu
- Time zone: UTC+5:30 (IST)
- PIN: 532264
- Vehicle registration: AP-30

Karthalipalem, also called Palem, is a village in Srikakulam district of the Indian state of Andhra Pradesh. It is located in Sompeta mandal and the Mahendratanaya River flows besides the village.

== Demographics ==
The Karthalipalem village has population of 2853 of which 1414 are males while 1439 are females as per Population 2011, Indian Census.

== Government and politics ==
Karthalipalem Gram Panchayat is the Local self-government of the village The panchayat has a total of 11 wards and each ward is represented by an elected ward member The ward members are headed by a Sarpanch.
