= Taizo Kawada =

Japanese golf critic (1944–2026)

- 川田 太三
- Born: February 20, 1944; Tokyo, Japan
- Died: July 25, 2026 (aged 82)
- Occupations: Golf critic, designer
- Notable work: Narita Golf Club; Hananoki Golf Club; Golf 5 Country Mizunami Course; Sapporo Minami Golf Club

Taizo Kawada (川田 太三; February 20, 1944 – July 25, 2026) was a Japanese golf course architect and rules official. He designed courses across Japan, including Narita Golf Club in Chiba Prefecture and Hananoki Golf Club in Gifu Prefecture. From 1990 he refereed at men's major championships, among them the Open Championship, the U.S. Open and the Masters.

== Early life and career ==
Taizo Kawada was born in Tokyo on February 20, 1944. He started getting interested in golf when he was a young age. He studied in Rikkyo University, then beginning his education in the United States, studying at Ohio State University, where he also learned how to design golf clubs. After that, he was transferred to Rikkyo University again. After graduating, he established a private office, T&K International, and became the representative director. He was also an amateur golfer and has a track record of participating in the Japan Amateur Golf Championship and the Japan Open Golf Championship.

In 1985, Kawada made his professional design debut with the Ohara Country Club in Aichi Prefecture. Over his career, he designed 23 new golf courses and supervised the renovation of 29 existing layouts golf courses across Japan such as Narita Golf Club, Hokkaido Brooks Country Club, Wakasu Golf Links, and Eagle Point Golf Club. He served as the chairman of the Japan Society of Golf Course Architects from 2013 to 2023.

== Death ==
Kawada died on July 25, 2026, at the age of 82.
