= Baijia culture =

5000–3000 BC Chinese archaeological culture

Coordinates: 35.011331°N 105.909813°E

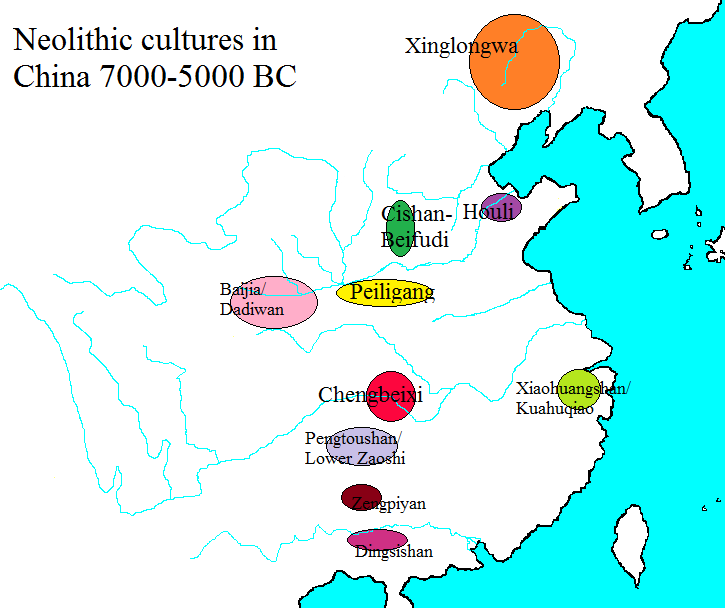
- Period: Neolithic
- Dates: c. 5800 – c. 5000 BCE
- Preceded by: Peiligang culture, Dadiwan culture, Cishan culture
- Followed by: Yangshao culture

The Baijia culture (Ch:百家文化) is an ancient Neolithic culture of China, dated to 5800-5000 BCE. It is considered as the earliest Chinese culture to make painted pottery. The pottery was sometimes painted in simple red.

The Baijia culture occupied a large area, in the Shaanxi-Gansu region.

It is thought that painted pottery then reached the Yangshao culture, with its Lingkou and Banpo type of potteries, which developed from 5000 to 4200 BCE.

The Baijia culture and Dadiwan culture are very similar and located near each other.

== See also ==
- List of Neolithic cultures of China
