= Yangshao culture =

5000–3000 BC Chinese archaeological culture

Coordinates: 36°18′N 109°06′E

- Geographical range: Middle reaches of Yellow River
- Period: Neolithic
- Dates: c. 5000 – c. 3000 BC
- Major sites: Shuanghuaishu, Banpo, Jiangzhai
- Preceded by: Peiligang culture, Cishan culture, Dadiwan culture, Baijia culture
- Followed by: Majiayao (3300–2000 BC); Longshan culture (3000-1900 BC); Shimao culture (2300-1800 BE)

Chinese name
- Chinese: 仰韶文化
Transcriptions
Standard Mandarin
- Hanyu Pinyin: Yǎngsháo wénhuà

The Yangshao culture (Chinese: 仰韶文化; pinyin: Yǎngsháo wénhuà) was a Neolithic culture that existed extensively along the middle reaches of the Yellow River in China from around 5000 BC to 3000 BC. The Yangshao culture saw social and technological development in the region, with advancements in agriculture, architecture, and crafts.

The culture is named after the Yangshao site, the first excavated site of this culture, which was discovered in 1921 in the town of Yangshao in western Henan by the Swedish geologist Johan Gunnar Andersson (1874–1960). The culture flourished mainly in Henan, as well as the neighboring provinces of Shaanxi and Shanxi.

Recent research indicates a common origin and spread of the Sino-Tibetan languages with the Cishan, Yangshao and/or Majiayao cultures.

== Origins ==
After the discovery of the Yangshao site in 1921, Johan Gunnar Andersson hypothesized, based on his analysis of the pottery patterns, that the Yangshao culture was originated from Anau and Trypillian cultures, from Central Asia and Southeast Europe. His hypothesis is considered weak, as the similarity of the pottery patterns are now considered coincidental, and in 1954, it was estimated the Yangshao culture was more than 1,000 years older than the Anau culture.

Later, Chinese archeologists, such as Yin Da, Shi Zhangru and Guo Baojun argued that the Yangshao culture was developed by the indigenous population from the Yellow River and transitioned to other cultures. Liang Siyong discovered a three-layer stratigraphy at the Hougang site, confirming the transaction from the Yangshao culture to the Longshan and Shang cultures. It is now understood that the Yangshao culture had a big impact in the pottery culture Central Plains region, being transmitted from east to west. Some examples are the Shandong Longshan culture, considered to be its eastern branch, and the Majiayao culture, its western.

== Phases ==
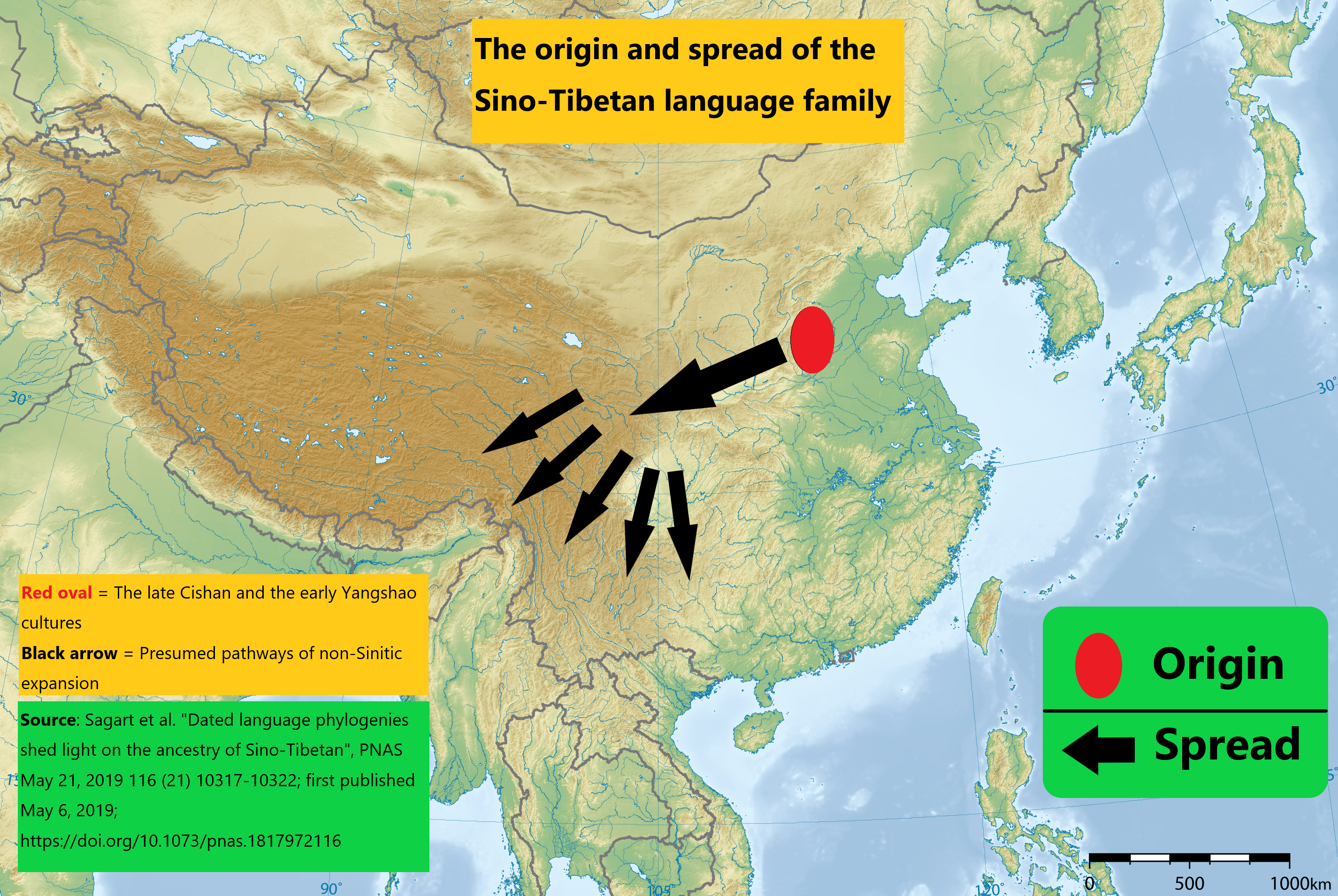
Red oval is the late Cishan and the early Yangshao cultures. After applying the linguistic comparative method to the database of comparative linguistic data developed by Laurent Sagart in 2019 to identify sound correspondences and establish cognates, phylogenetic methods are used to infer relationships among these languages and estimate the age of their origin and homeland.

The Yangshao culture is conventionally divided into three phases:

- The Early Yangshao period or Banpo phase (c. 5000–4000 BC) is represented by the Banpo, Jiangzhai, Beishouling and Dadiwan sites in the Wei River valley in Shaanxi.
- The Middle Yangshao period or Miaodigou phase (c. 4000–3500 BC) saw an expansion of the culture and population in all directions, and the development of hierarchies of settlements in some areas, such as western Henan.
- The Late Yangshao period (c. 3500–3000 BC) saw a greater spread of settlement hierarchies. The first wall of rammed earth in China was built around the settlement of Xishan (25 ha) in central Henan (near modern Zhengzhou).

The Majiayao culture (c. 3300 – c. 2000 BCE) to the west is now considered a separate culture that developed from the middle Yangshao culture through an intermediate Shilingxia phase.

== Economy ==
=== Subsistence ===
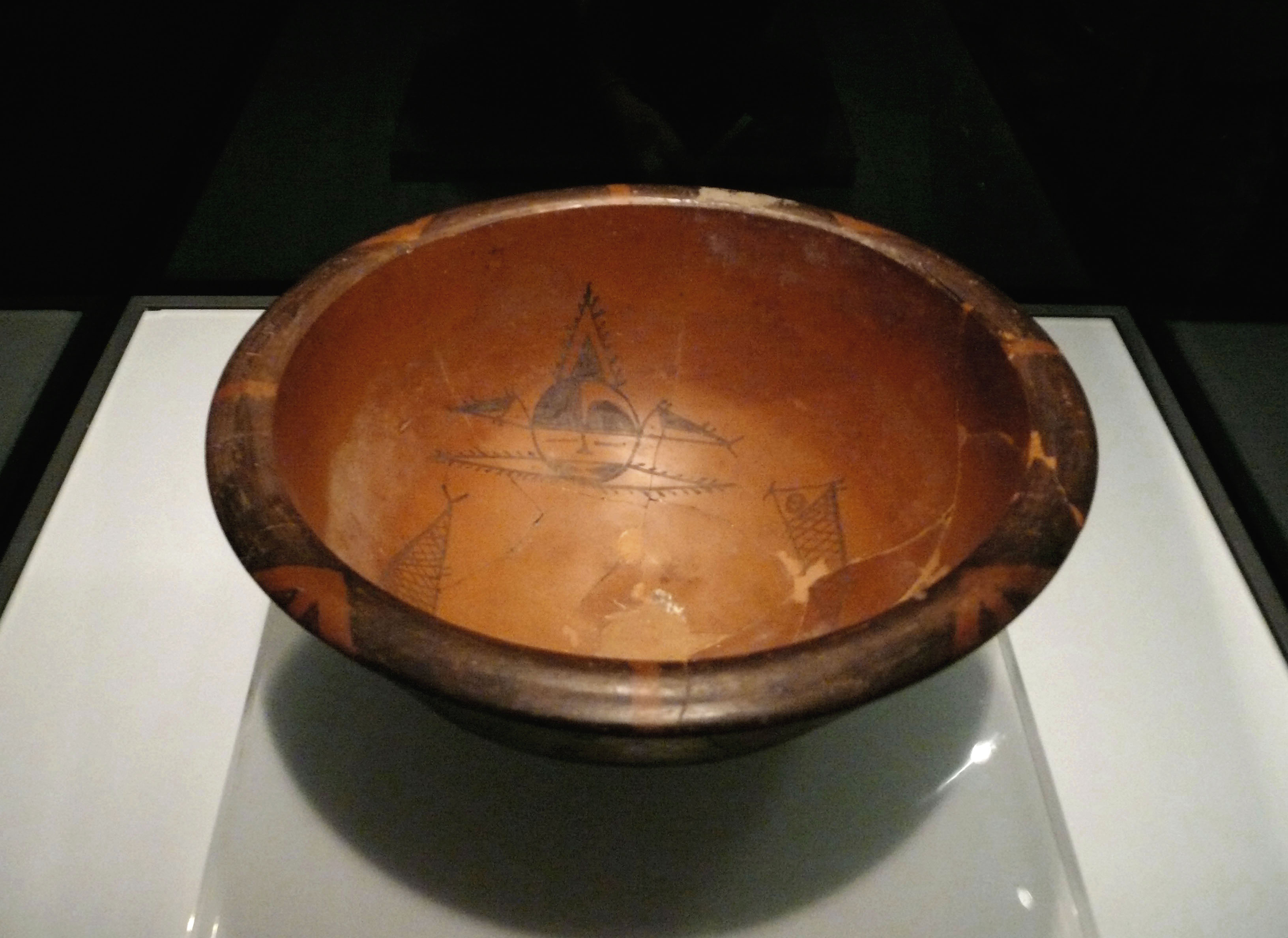
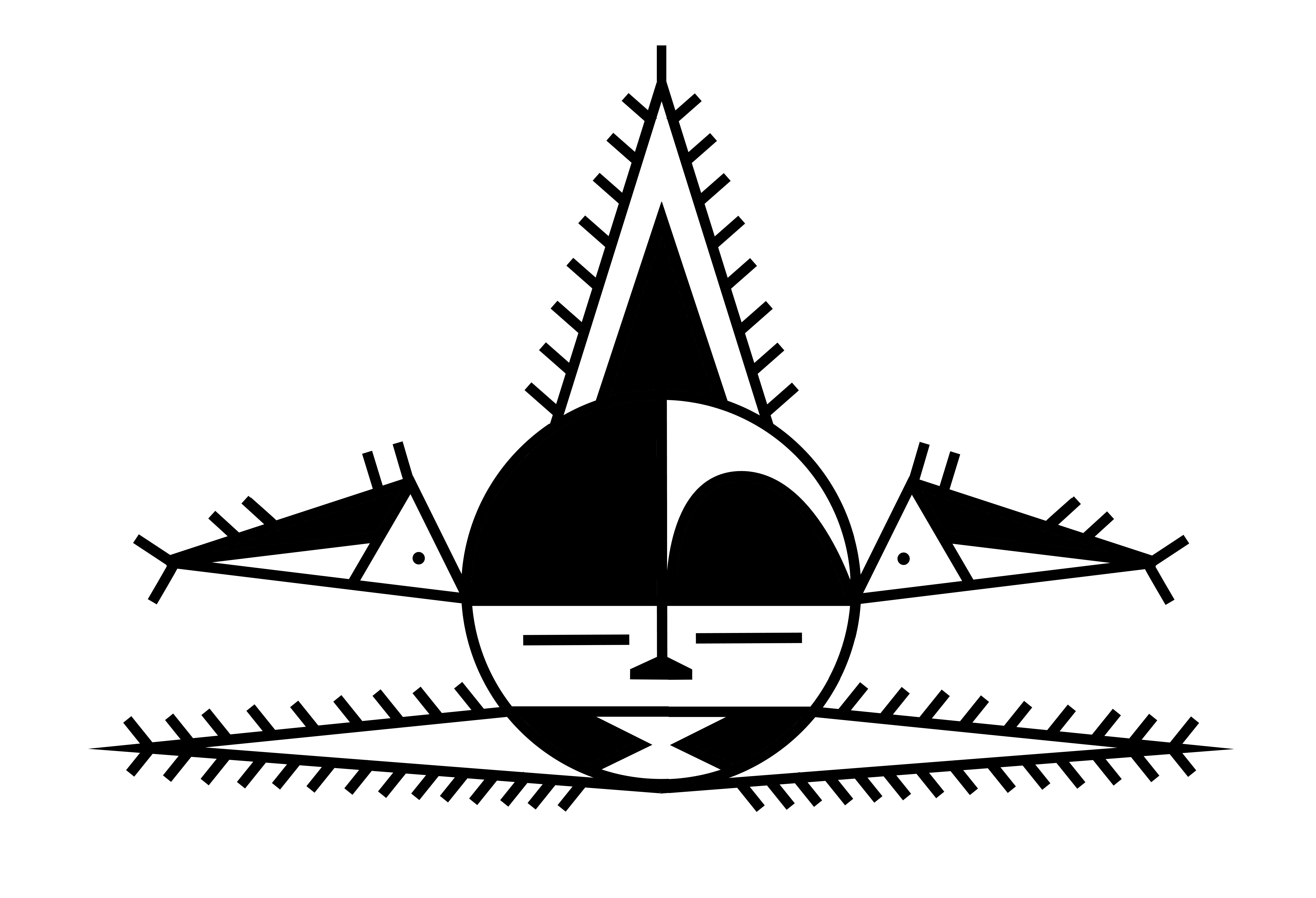
Bowl of the Banpo culture (first stage of the Yangshao culture), with geometrial human face motif and fish, 4500–3500 BC, Shaanxi.

The main food of the Yangshao people was millet, with some sites using foxtail millet and others proso millet. The Yangshao people cultivated and consumed rice, though to a lesser extent than millet. The exact nature of early Yangshao agriculture, small-scale slash-and-burn cultivation versus intensive agriculture in permanent fields, is currently a matter of debate. Once the soil was exhausted, residents picked up their belongings, moved to new lands, and constructed new villages. During the late Yangshao period, the region became a fully settled farming society, with an economy centered on growing crops and raising animals.

During the Yangshao period, advancements in farming techniques and crop cultivation led to improvements in agricultural productivity. Dryland agriculture was of importance to the Yangshao culture starting in the middle Yangshao culture period. The introduction of mixed farming across more sites played a crucial role in shifting subsistence practices away from gathering. As a result, agriculture became the dominant means of sustenance, ultimately laying the foundation for the development of an agricultural society in the Central Plain.

Archaeological research indicates that beer brewing and communal feasting were integral aspects of Yangshao culture. Evidence suggests that Yangshao people produced beer primarily using common millet and rice, while foxtail millet was notably absent from the brewing process. These brewing practices, along with associated social gatherings, indicate that rice may have been a valuable resource to larger Yangshao settlements.

The Yangshao people kept pigs and dogs. Sheep, goats, and cattle are found much more rarely. Reared domestic pigs were the main source of meat for the Yangshao people, while a small amount of hunted animals were also included in their diet. They may also have practiced an early form of sericulture.

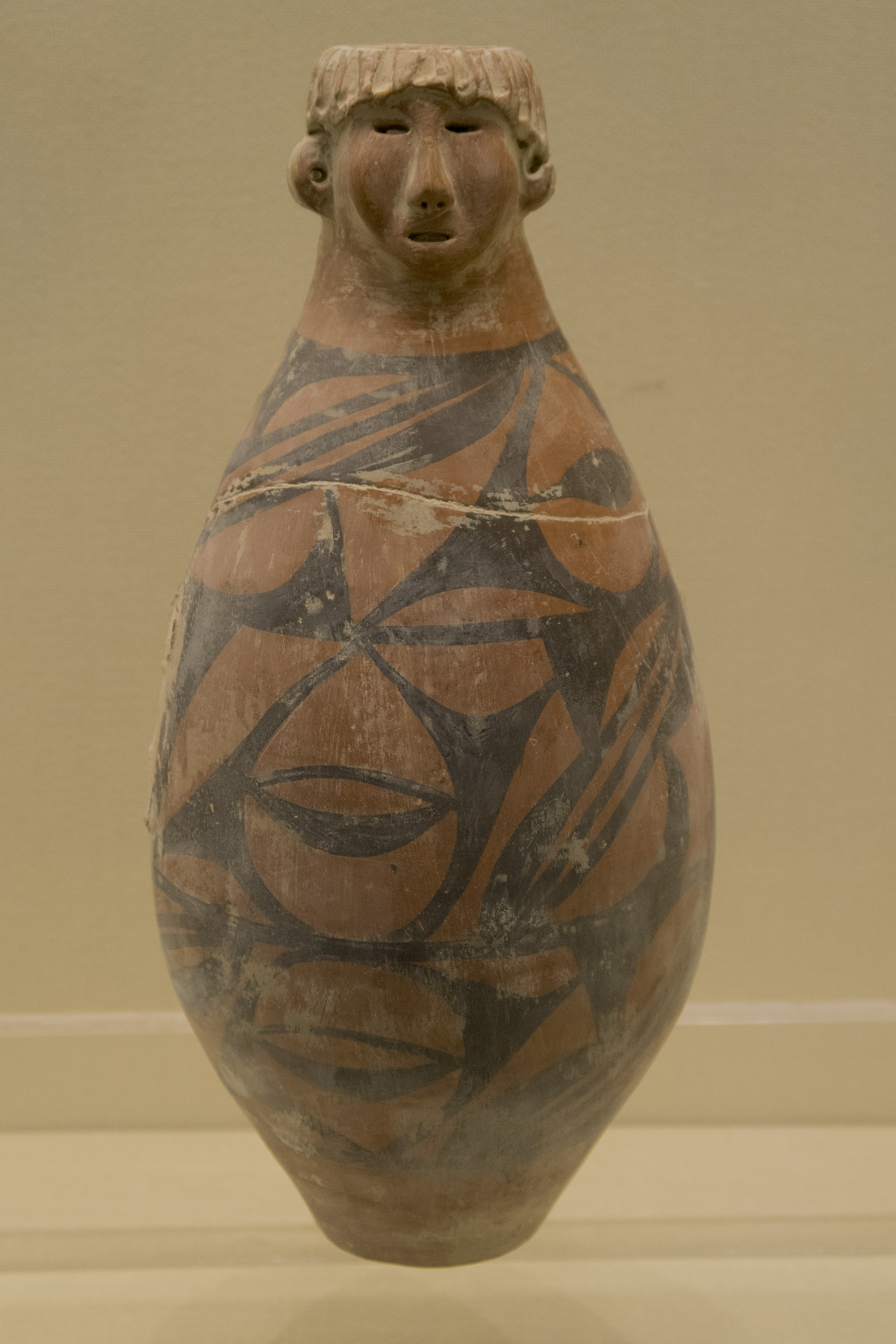
Human head-shaped mouth colored pottery bottle. Dated 4000-3500 BCE, Early Yangshao-Dadiwan culture. Excavated in Dadiwan, Gansu.

The Yangshao people gradually introduced rice into young children's diets alongside foxtail millet and broomcorn millet. This practice was used for both weaning and post-weaning transitional foods, leading to variations in early childhood nutrition and distinct feeding practices among the Yangshao.

=== Tools ===
The Yangshao would hunt and fish with stone tools. Their stone tools were polished and highly specialized.. From an agricultural point of view, these sophisticated stone tools take the form of meadow axes, hoes, sickles, millstones, etc. These farmers valued two types of plots, the first on alluvial deposits in the lowlands, which are often wet, the second on the loess that cover the easily drained high lands at the edge of the valleys.

During the Yangshao period, the development of stone axe types flourished in the Guanzhong Plain. By the late Yangshao period, stone axes began to show specialized functions, with some used for woodworking and others for chopping. Differences in raw materials suggest these tools were produced and used by different groups.

Ceramic and stone harvesting knives appear in the Yangshao period, replacing earlier stone sickles found in the Peiligang and Cishan cultures. The earliest harvesting knives are rectangular, with notches and/or perforation used to attach a cord.

Usually crafted from fine sandstone, these tools were likely used to process soft materials like plants, and sometimes for cutting grains.. Grain residues and their marks on pottery attest to the abundance of crops. There are many arguments to assert that they are not primitive farmers, as they may have appeared to the first excavators or discoverers of sites adjoining the first heights of the valleys, but that they are heirs to multiple and distant agrarian civilizations.

=== Crafts ===
The Yangshao culture crafted pottery: Yangshao artisans created fine white, red, and black painted pottery with human facial, animal, and geometric designs. Unlike the later Longshan culture, the Yangshao culture did not use pottery wheels in pottery-making. Pottery style emerging from the Yangshao culture spread westward to the Majiayao culture, and then further to Xinjiang and Central Asia.

Pottery production during the Yangshao period saw development at an increased pace, leading to the creation of unique ceramic forms. One example is the jiandiping amphora, recognized by its narrow opening, cone-shaped base, and varied rim styles. The amphorae may have been used to ferment grain to create alcoholic beverages, although research also suggests that amphorae were rather used to filter impurities in alcoholic beverages. The pottery patterns changed with time. In the beginning of the Yangshao culture, there was a preference for fish patterns, but it later changed to more abstract, streamlined, and geometric patterns in the middle period and monochromic fashion in the late period.

The Yangshao culture produced silk to a small degree and wove hemp. Men wore loin clothes and tied their hair in a top knot. Women wrapped a length of cloth around themselves and tied their hair in a bun.

== Structures ==
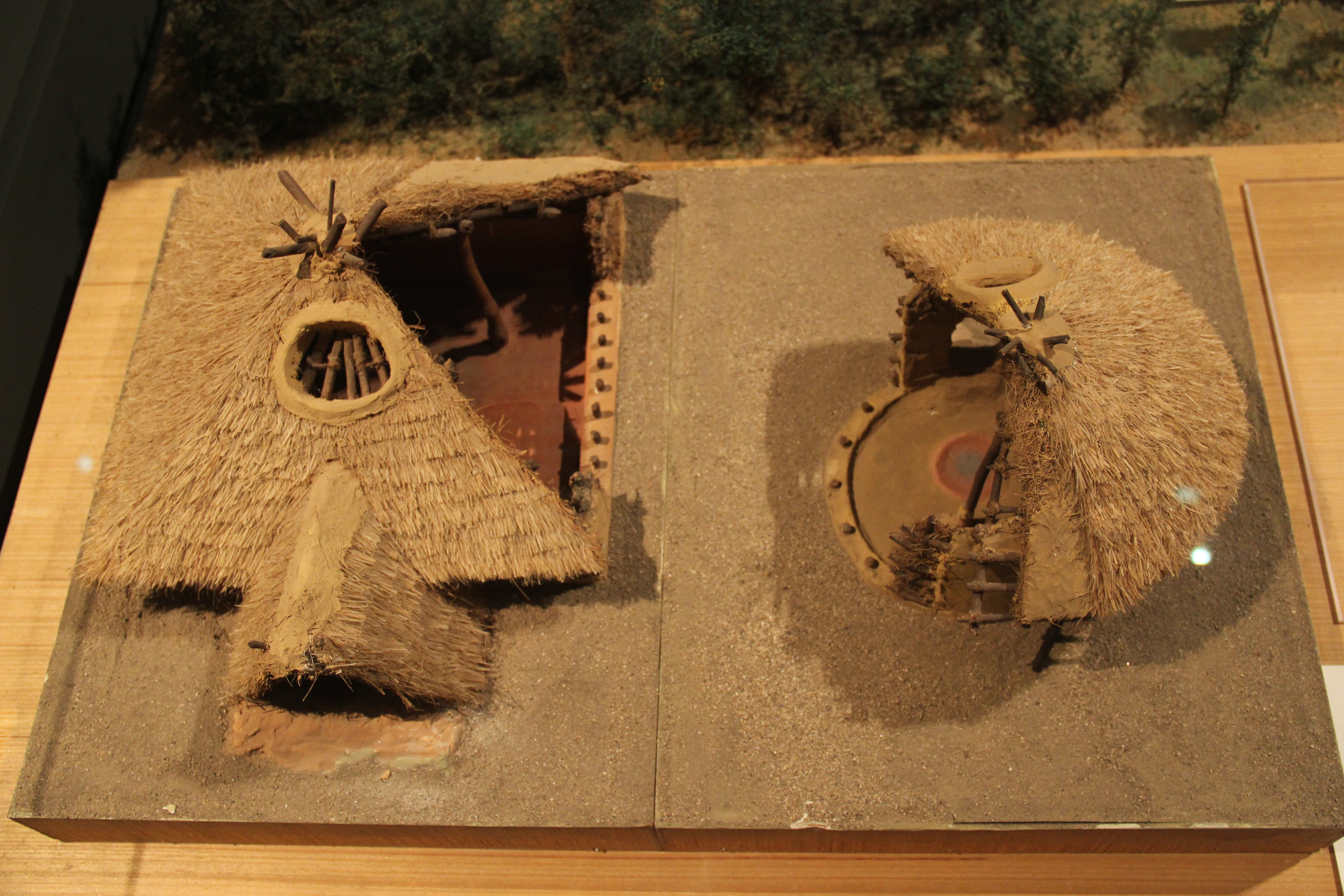
Jiangzhai settlement model, Yangshao culture

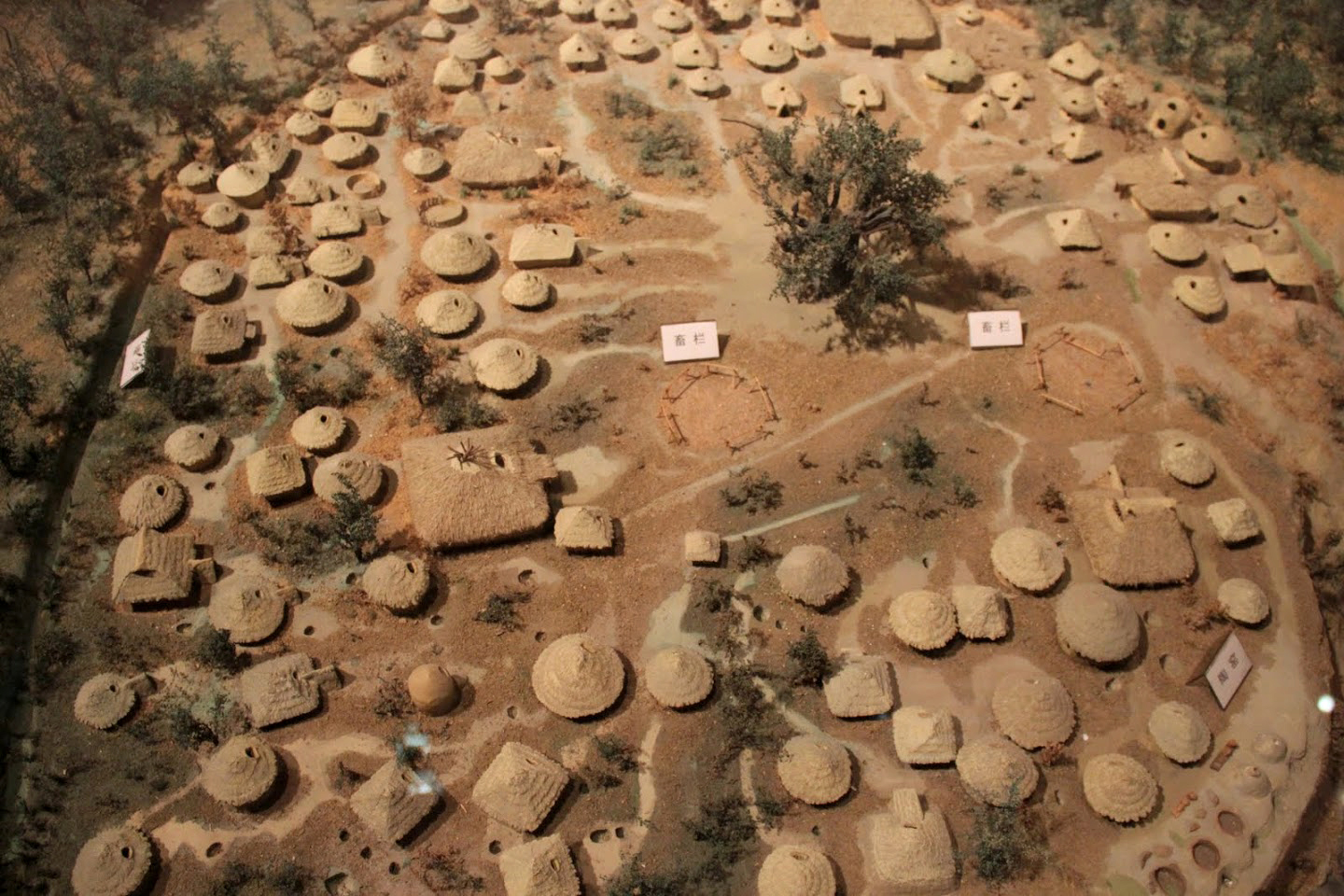
A model of Jiangzhai, a Yangshao village

During the early Yangshao culture, a variety of architectural styles emerged, reflecting the development of construction techniques. Housing structures were categorized into five main types: small and medium round houses, small and medium square or rectangular houses, and large square dwellings. These buildings were constructed either as semi-subterranean homes, which provided insulation, or as ground-level structures. Based on evidence such as the presence of communal storage pits and the performance of shared tasks within public structures, it is likely that certain elements of production and distribution were managed collectively. These large public buildings may have served as hubs for community-based activities.

Middle Yangshao settlements such as Jiangzhi contain raised-floor buildings that may have been used for the storage of surplus grains. Grinding stones for making flour were also found.

In the late Yangshao period, architecture underwent significant changes. Square ground-level houses became the most common form, and longhouses with multiple rooms began to appear. Some homes featured floors covered with a layer of lime. Organizational features first seen in the middle Yangshao period persisted, including large settlements associated with public buildings resembling palaces. This period also saw the emergence of the first walled-town site in the Yellow River valley.

Excavations at various Yangshao sites have uncovered large structures that appear to have served as public ritual spaces rather than homes for elites. It was not until the late Longshan culture that substantial palace-like residences for elites were built at locations such as Guchengzhai and Taosi, indicating the early stages of residential separation between social classes.

Residential homes were typically built by digging a rounded rectangular pit around one meter deep. Then they were rammed, and a lattice of wattle was woven over it. Then it was plastered with mud. The floor was also rammed down.

Next, a few short wattle poles would be placed around the top of the pit, and more wattle would be woven to it. It was plastered with mud, and a framework of poles would be placed to make a cone shape for the roof. Poles would be added to support the roof. It was then thatched with millet stalks. There was little furniture; a shallow fireplace in the middle with a stool, a bench along the wall, and a bed of cloth. Food and items were placed or hung against the walls. A pen would be built outside for animals.

Yangshao villages typically covered ten to fourteen acres and were composed of houses around a central square.

== Social structure ==
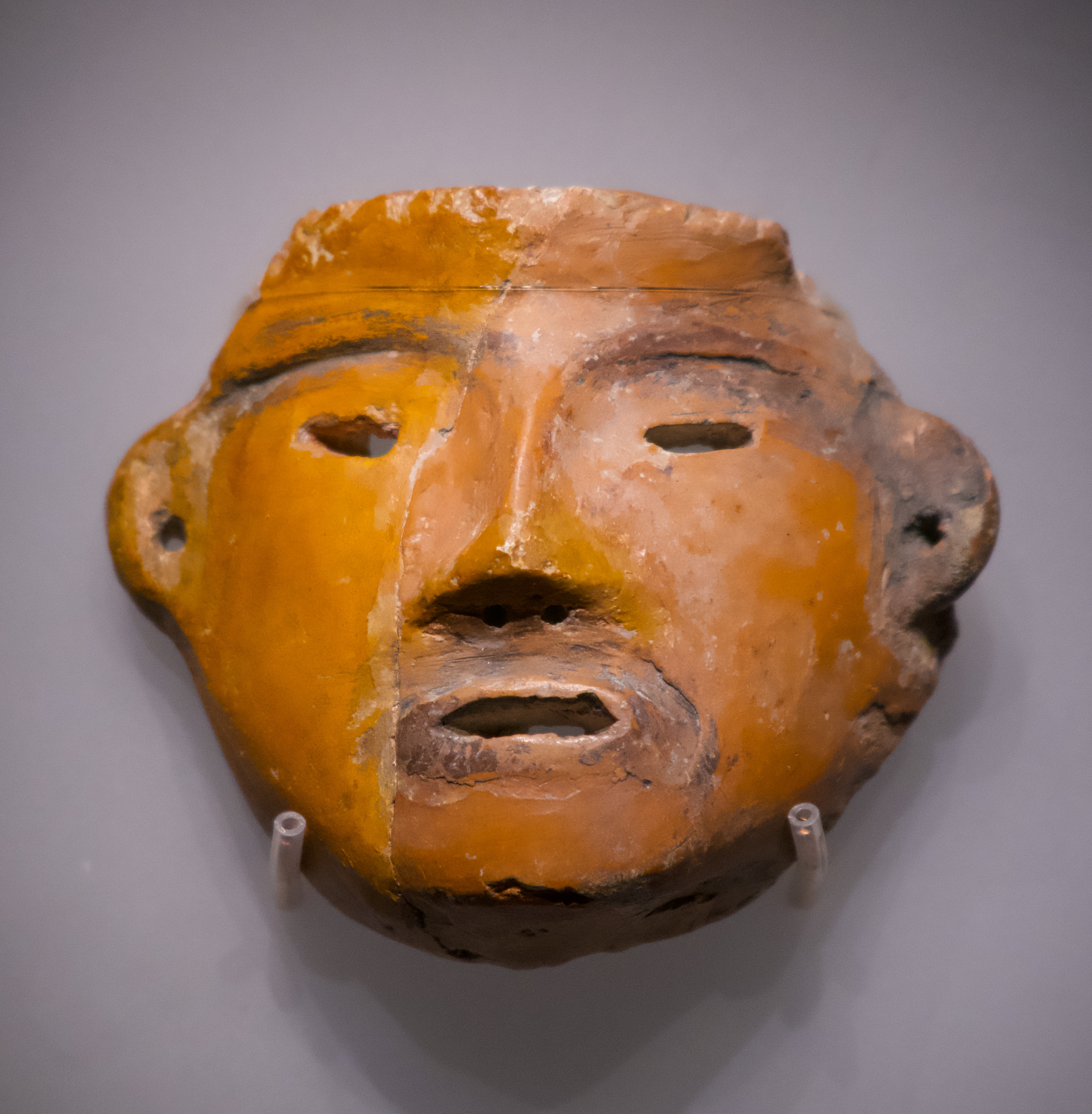
Beishouling pottery head, 5000-3000 BCE. Baoji, Shaanxi

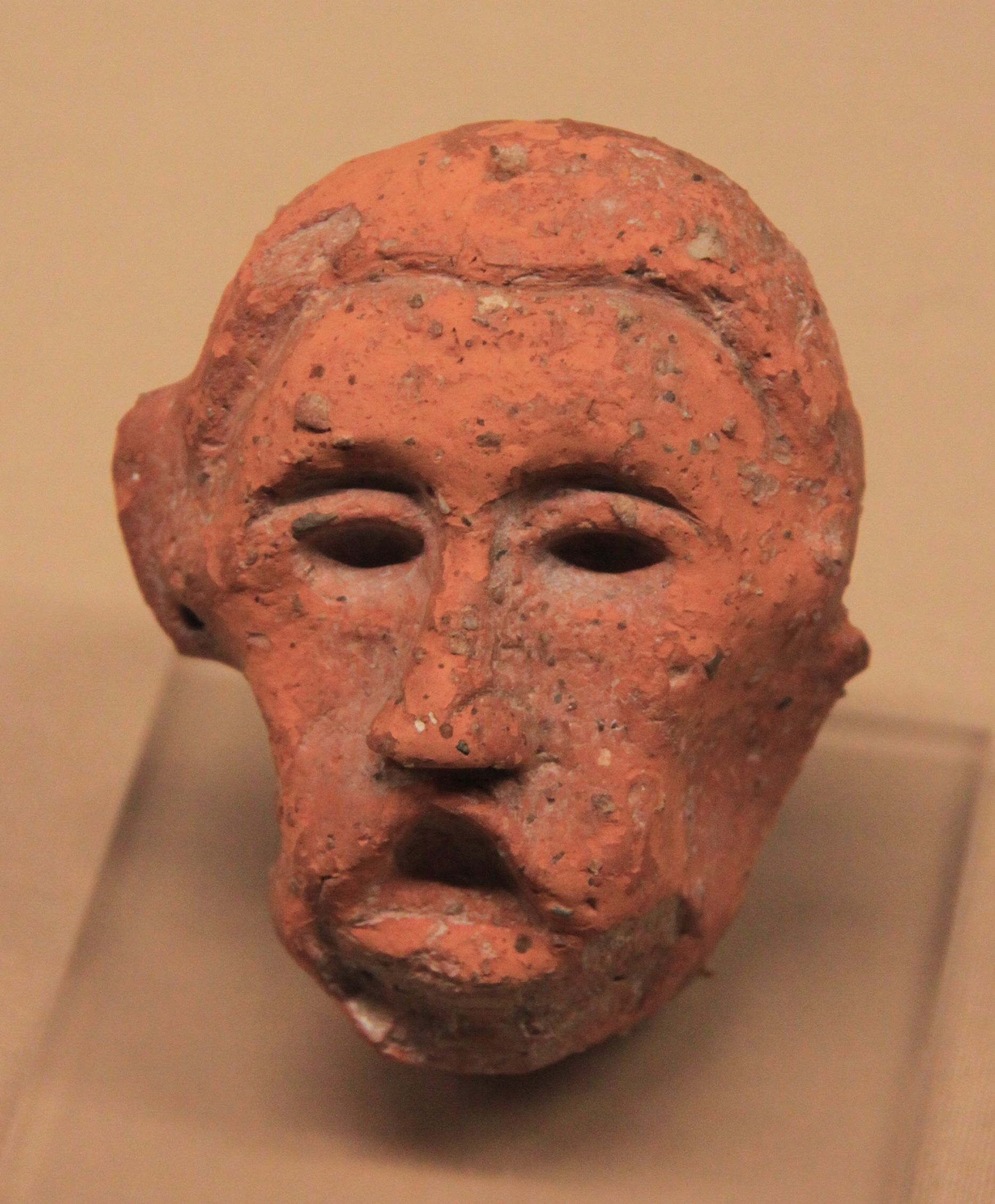
Liujiahe pottery head, 5000-3000 BCE, Ankang city, Shaanxi. (Note: A few Yangshao pottery heads, including one found in Liujiahe in Ankang, southern Shaanxi, "clearly show Caucasian characteristics", with "a long and large nose, deep eyes and narrow face". These archaeological finds suggest that during the prehistorical period different ethnic groups from west and east may have interacted in the region of the Wei River valley. See Liu, Li (6 January 2005). The Chinese Neolithic: Trajectories to Early States. Cambridge University Press. p. 90. ISBN 978-1-139-44170-4. "A clay mask of a human head, 10 cm in height, was found at Liujiahe in Ankang, southern Shaanxi (Shaanxi Institute 1998: 5), and dates to the Miaodigou phase of the middle Yangshao period (Wang Weilin 2002, personal communication). This realistically rendered sculpture has a long and large nose, deep eyes and narrow face. Each ear has a small hole, perhaps for wearing earrings. Another hole is placed on top of the head, probably for inserting a headdress. The back of this mask is concave in shape and two additional small holes are situated on the sides of the rear head, suggesting that the mask may have been attached to another object (Figure 4.11: 1). These two human heads clearly show Caucasian characteristics. (...) Most examples of Caucasoid figures as described above have been found in Fufeng near the Wei River, although their dates stretch from 4000 BC to 1000 BC. The Wei River valley is a region in which ethnic groups from west and east made contact with each other throughout history, thus it is entirely possible that such contacts had already taken place in prehistory.")

Archaeological evidence suggests that the social organization of the Yangshao culture underwent significant changes over time. In the early Yangshao period, society was primarily structured around clans connected by blood ties. However, as private ownership emerged in the later Yangshao period, these clan-based communities gradually gave way to smaller, independent family units. The development of monogamous, self-sufficient households led to distinct economic practices, with each family managing its own production methods and resources.

Although early reports suggested a matriarchal culture, others argue that it was a society in transition from matriarchy to patriarchy, while still others believe it to have been patriarchal.The debate hinges on differing interpretations of burial practices. Another interpretation is that the Yangshao culture had a parallel with a segmentary lineage system. Recent studies have demonstrated that the people of the Yangshao culture were patrilineal. New archeological sites, specially in the Xipo site, revealed very large houses and tombs with rich furnishes. This suggest the late Yangshao culture was an early form of chiefdom.

A Marxist analysis of the Yangshao site suggests that the inhabitants practiced punaluan marriage.

In the Yangshao culture, it was a common mortuary practice to place deceased children in funerary urns and bury them near the foundations of houses. All the children buried were girls.

The discovery of a Chinese dragon statue dating back to the fifth millennium BC in the Yangshao culture makes it the world's oldest known dragon depiction.

== Archaeological sites ==
Yangshao culture and contemporary cultures and polities c. 5000 BC

Yangshao, in Mianchi County, Sanmenxia, western Henan, the place which gave the culture its name, has a museum next to the archaeological site. The archaeological site of the village of Banpo near Xi'an is one of the best-known ditch-enclosed settlements of the Yangshao. Another major settlement called Jiangzhai was excavated out to its limits, and archaeologists found that it was completely surrounded by a ring-ditch. Both Banpo and Jiangzhai also yielded incised marks on pottery which a few have interpreted as numerals or perhaps precursors to Chinese characters, but such interpretations are not widely accepted.

== Artifacts ==
Ceramics

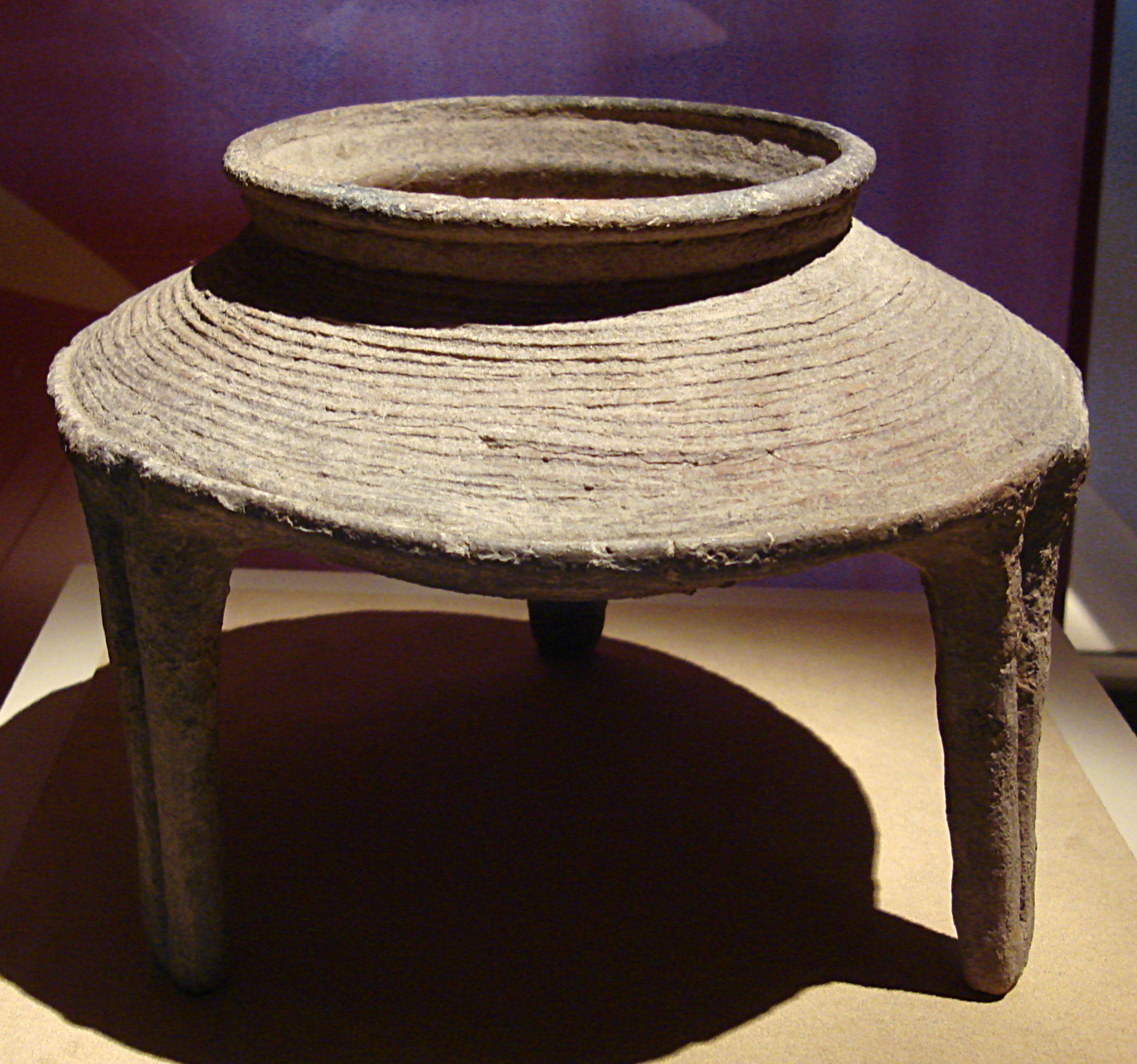
Ding, decorated with a string pattern

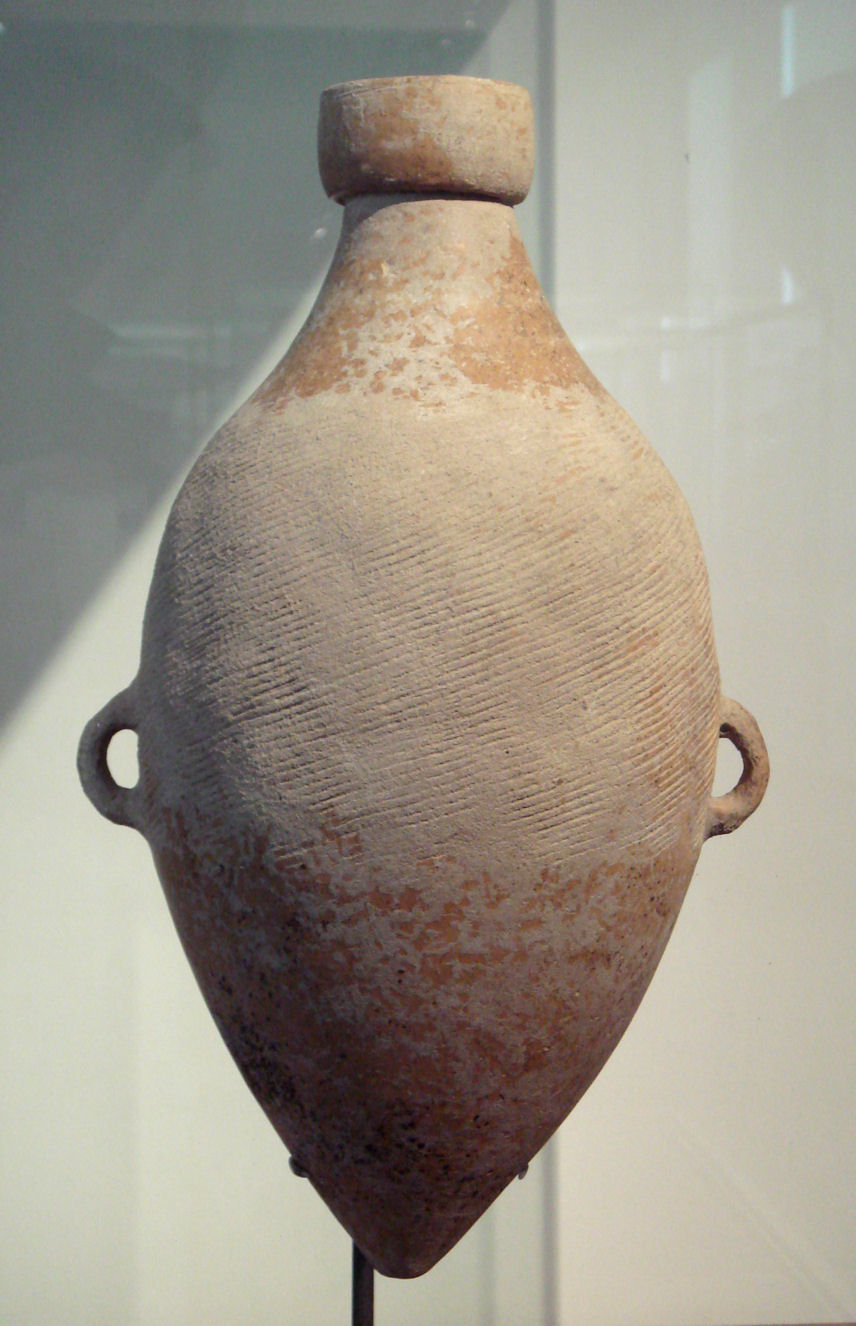
Cordmarked amphora; 4800 BC (Banpo phase); Guimet Museum (Paris)

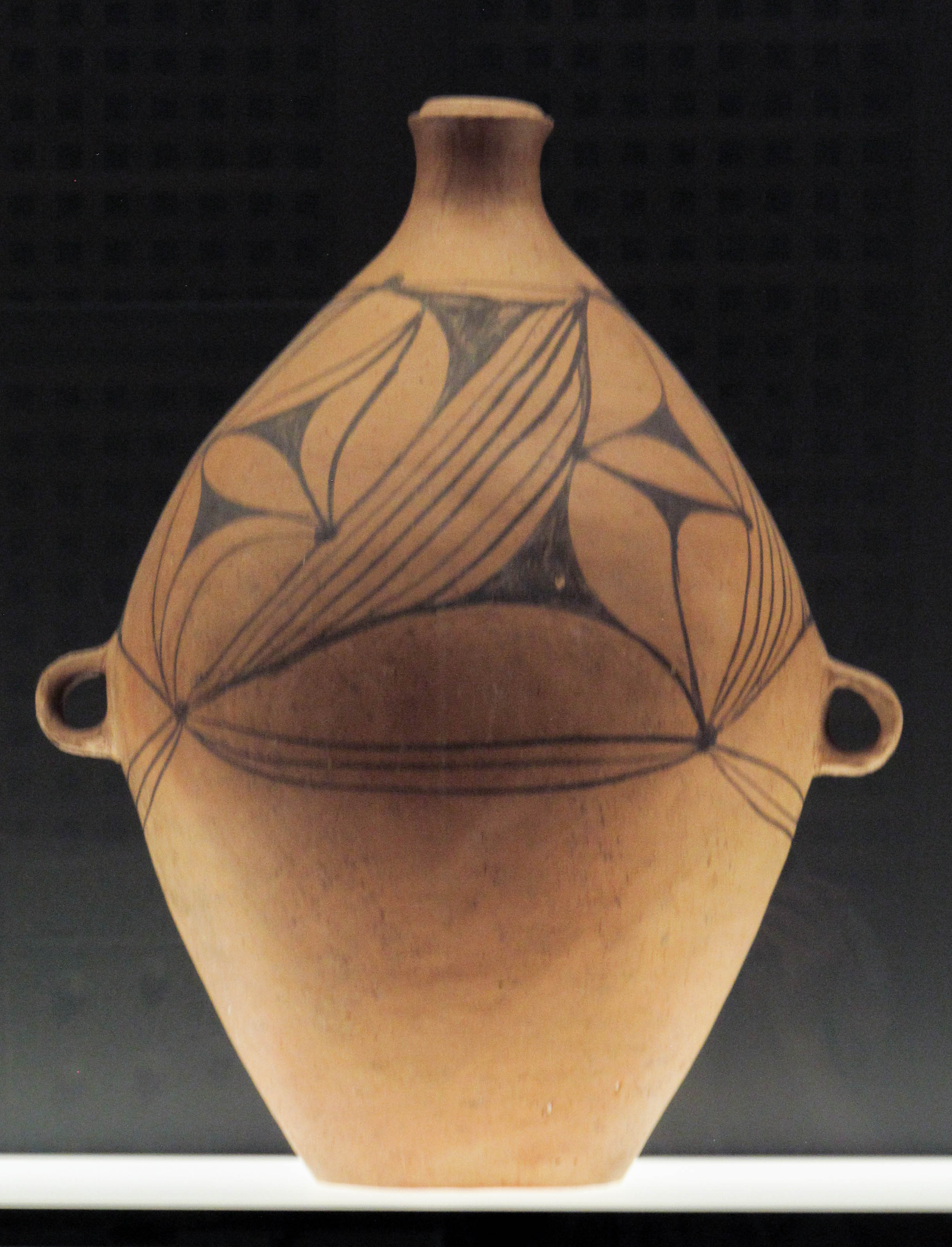
Large water vessel of the late Yangshao culture or early Majiayao; from Shaanxi, Shanxi or Gansu province; 4th millennium BC; Rietberg Museum (Zürich, Switzerland)

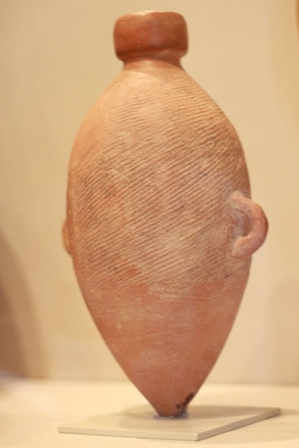
Red amphora with carrying handles; circa 5000 - 3000 BC; Honolulu Museum of Art (USA)

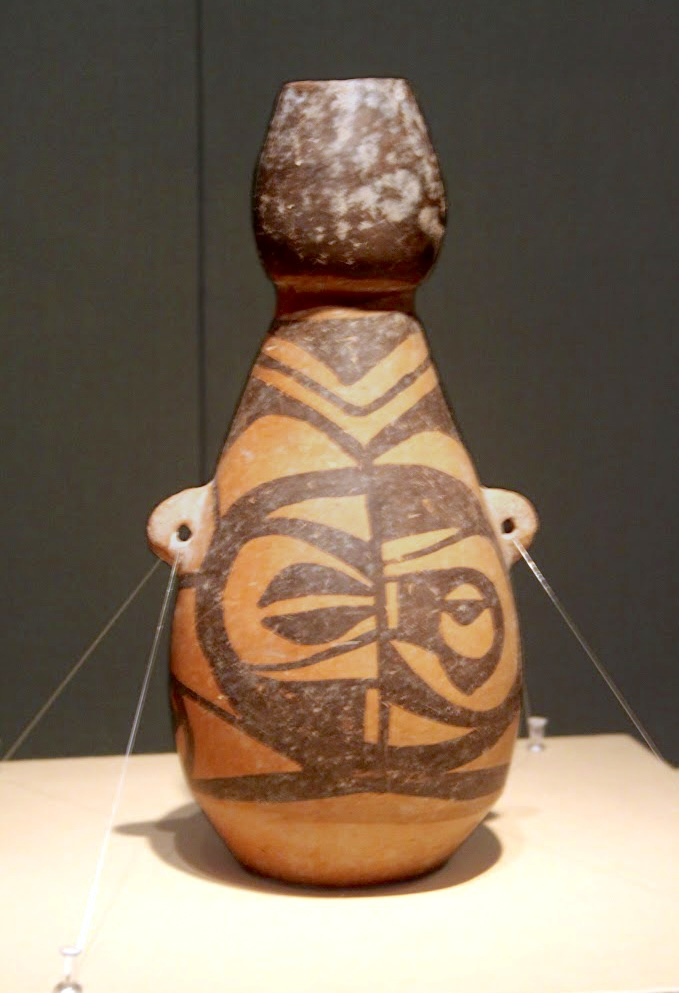
Pot; painted earthenware; in the Shijia style; Shaanxi History Museum

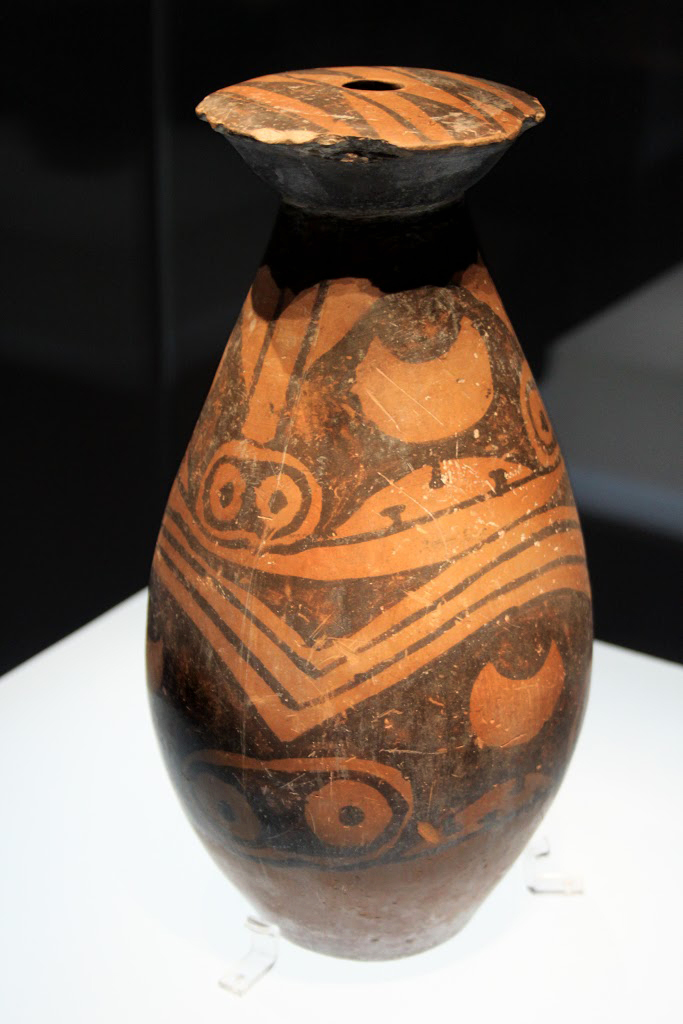
Pot; painted earthenware; height: 27.8 cm; in the Shijia style; Shaanxi History Museum

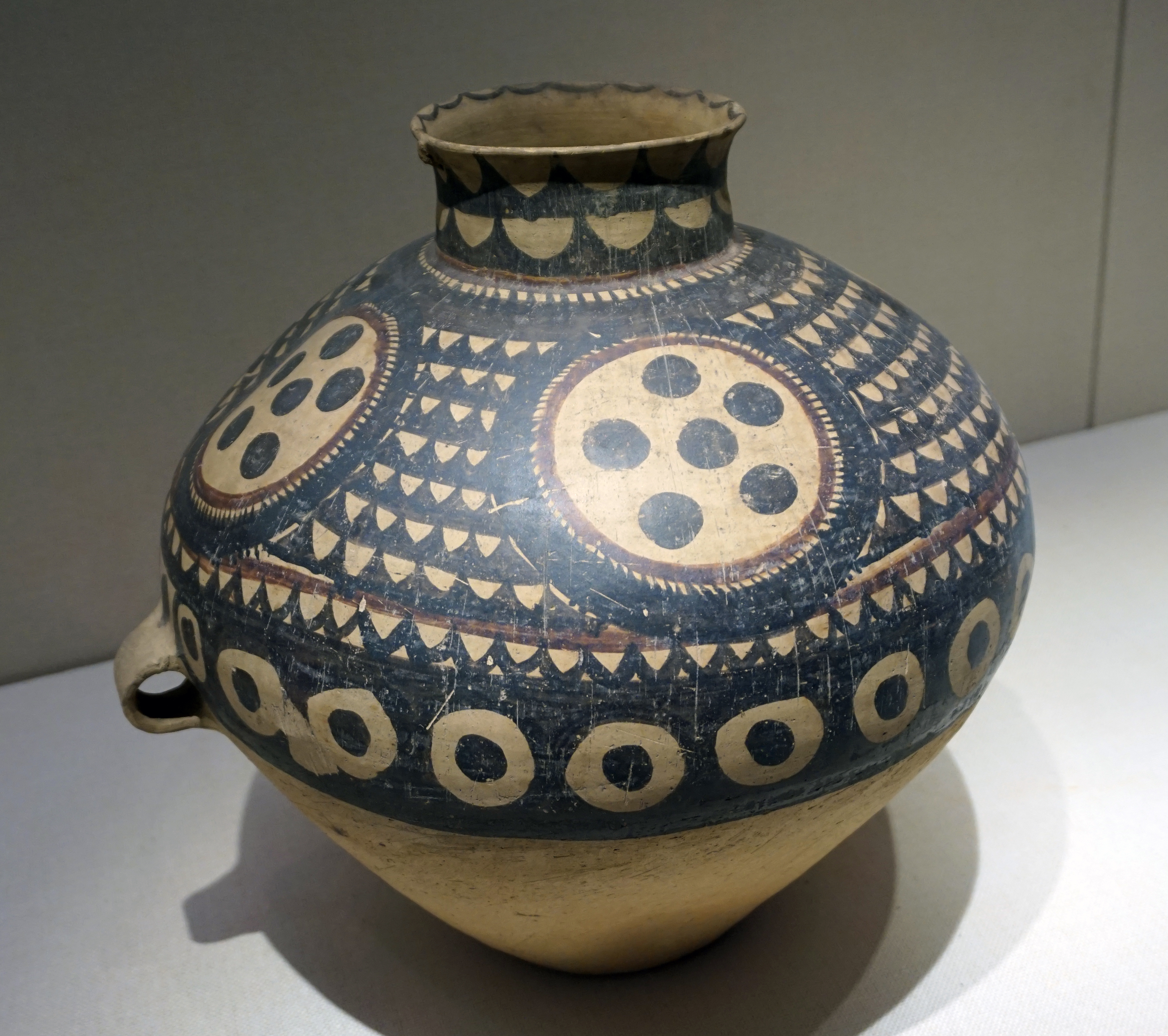
Dotted pottery pot, semi-mountain type; dating from 4700 to 4300 years ago (2700-2300 BC); Gansu Provincial Museum

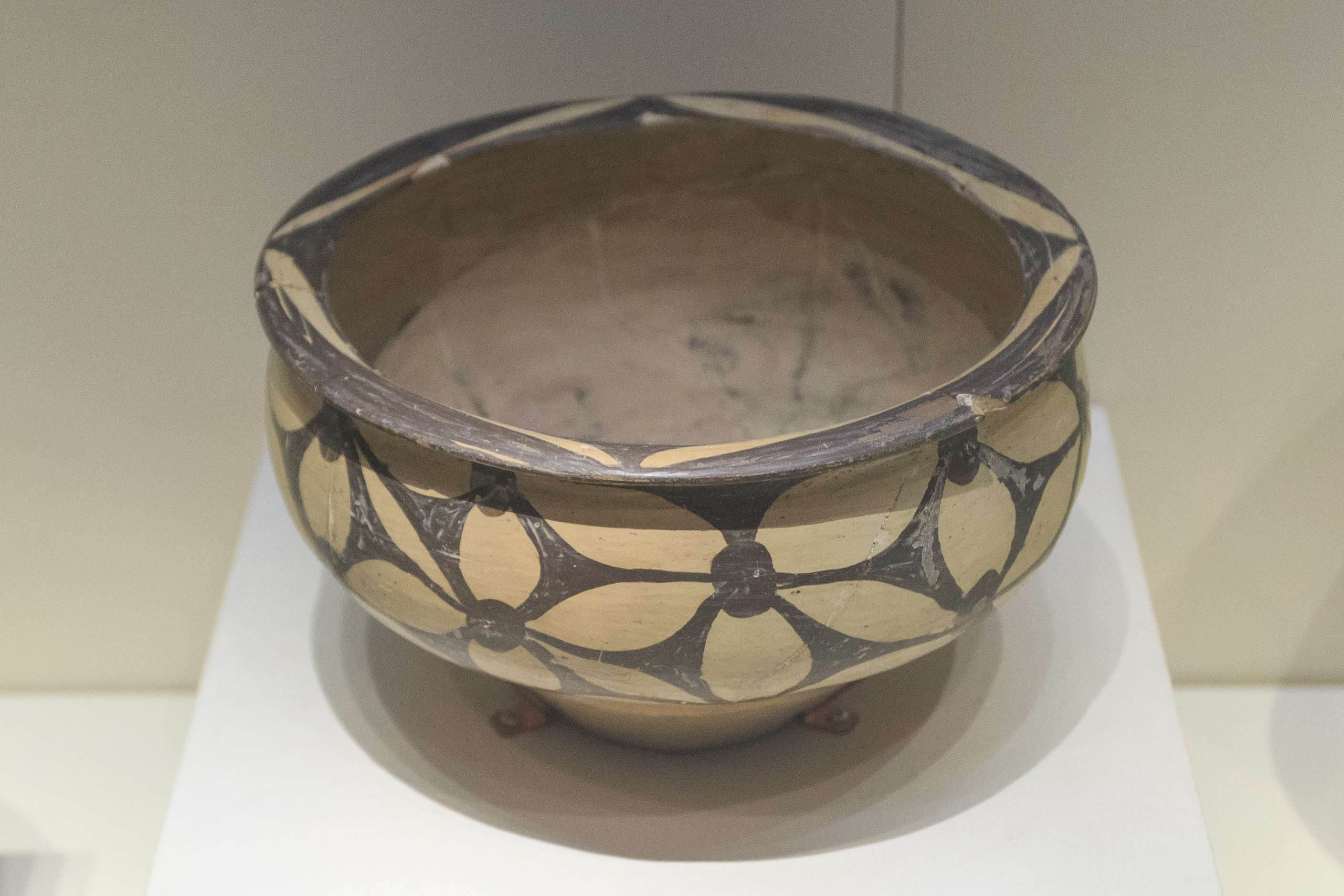
Painted pottery basin; 5000-3000 BC; National Museum of China

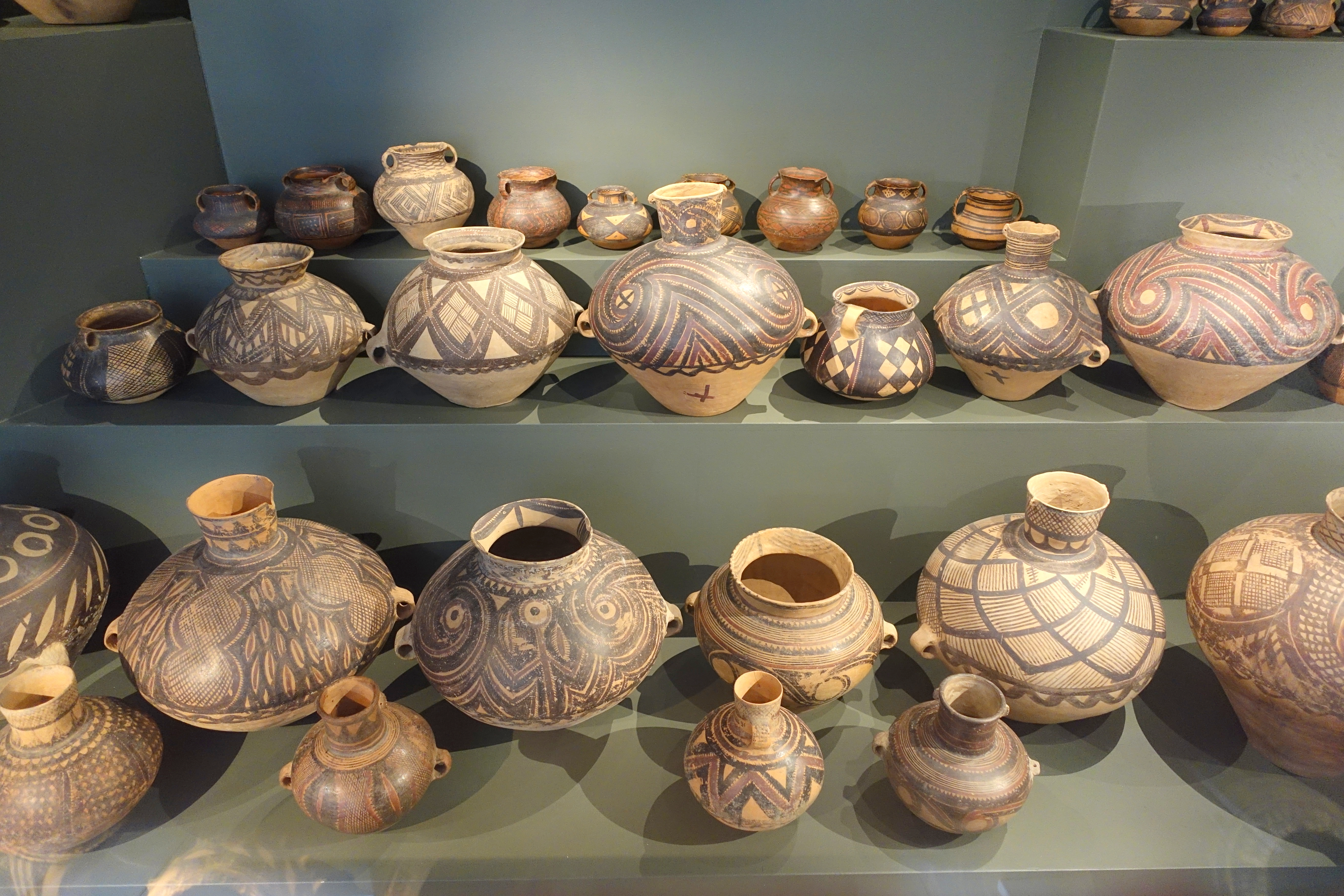
Pots, Yangshao culture; Museum of Far Eastern Antiquities (Östasiatiska museet), Stockholm.

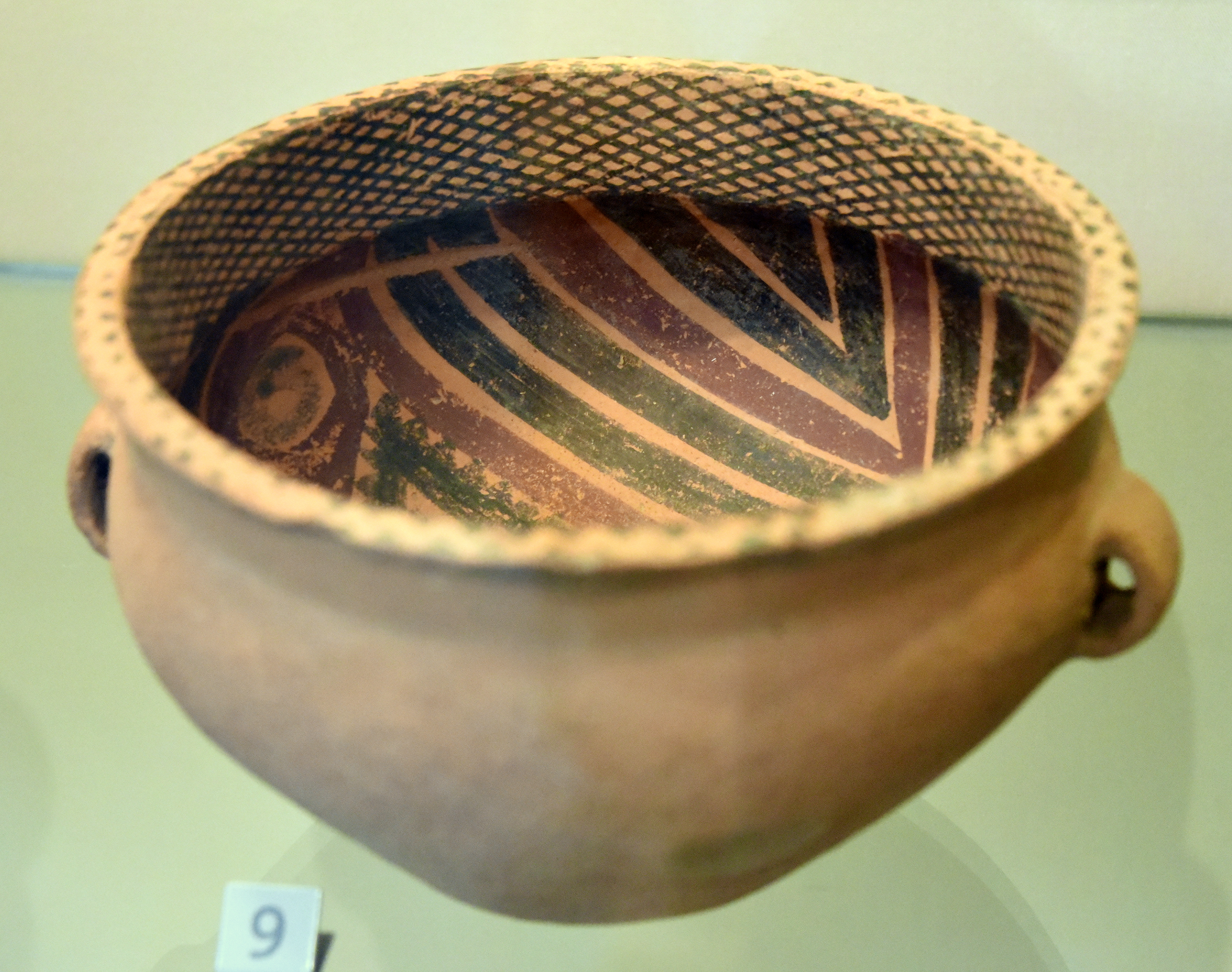
An earthenware bowl painted with red and black mineral pigment with ring handles, Gansu Province, Neolithic period, Yangshao culture, from the Garner Collection, in the Victoria and Albert Museum

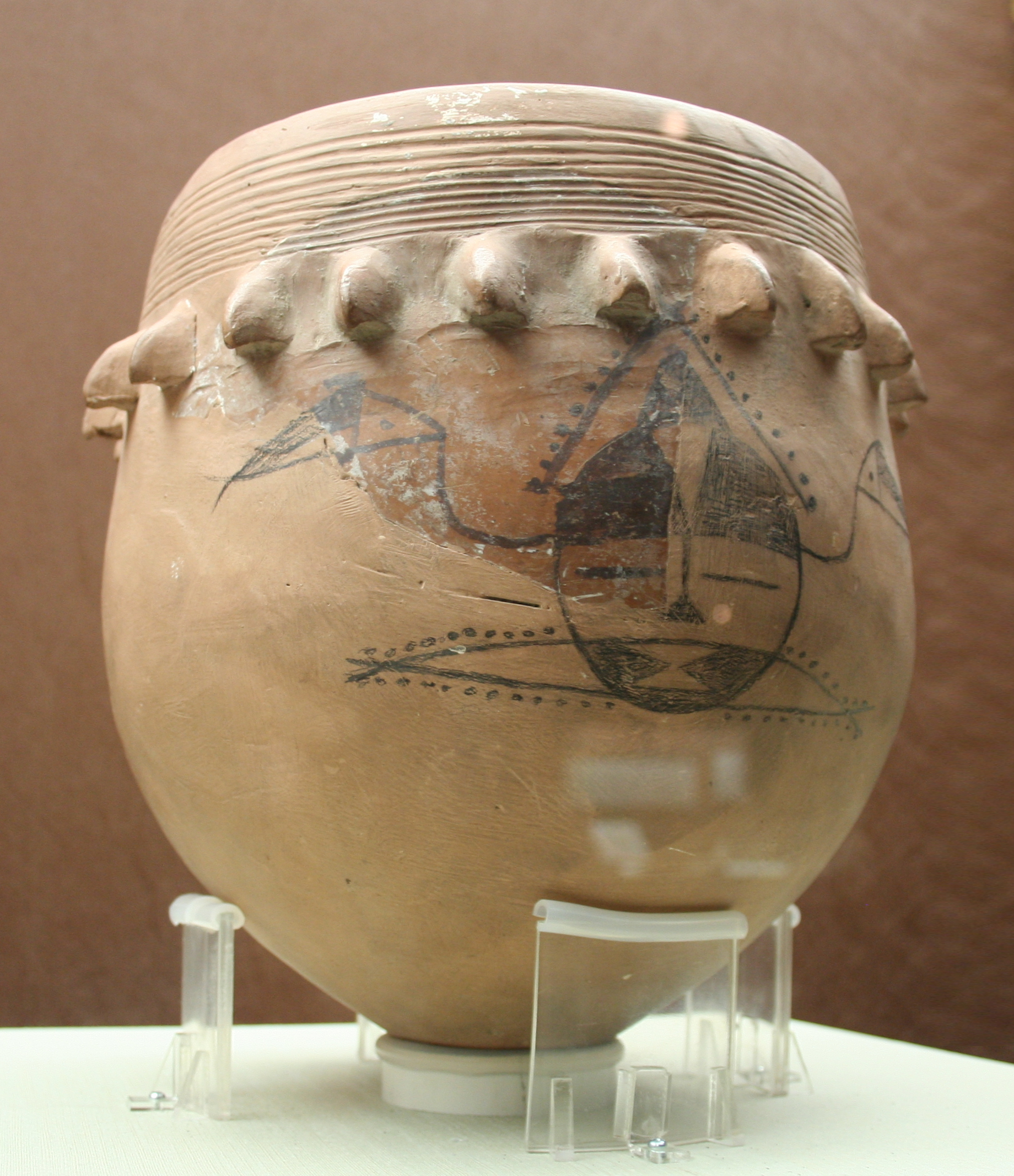
Pottery pot with human and fish design, Shaanxi province.

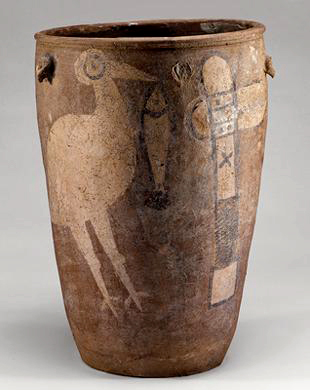
Coloured pottery pot depicting a stork, a fish, and a stone axe. Yangshao culture, Miaodigou phase (3900-3000 BC). Part of the List of Chinese cultural relics forbidden to be exhibited abroad.

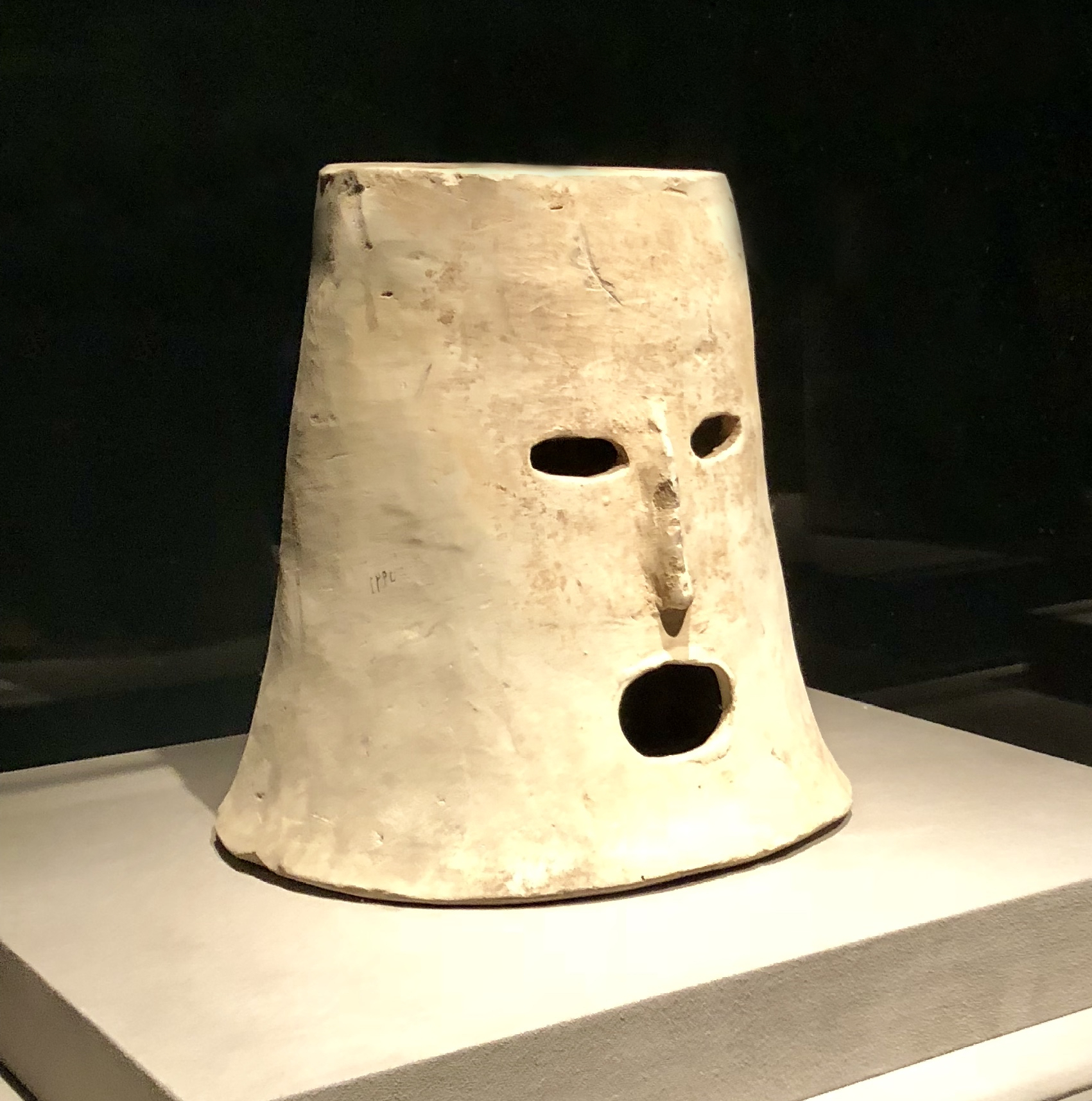
Miaodigou Culture mask, 3500 BC

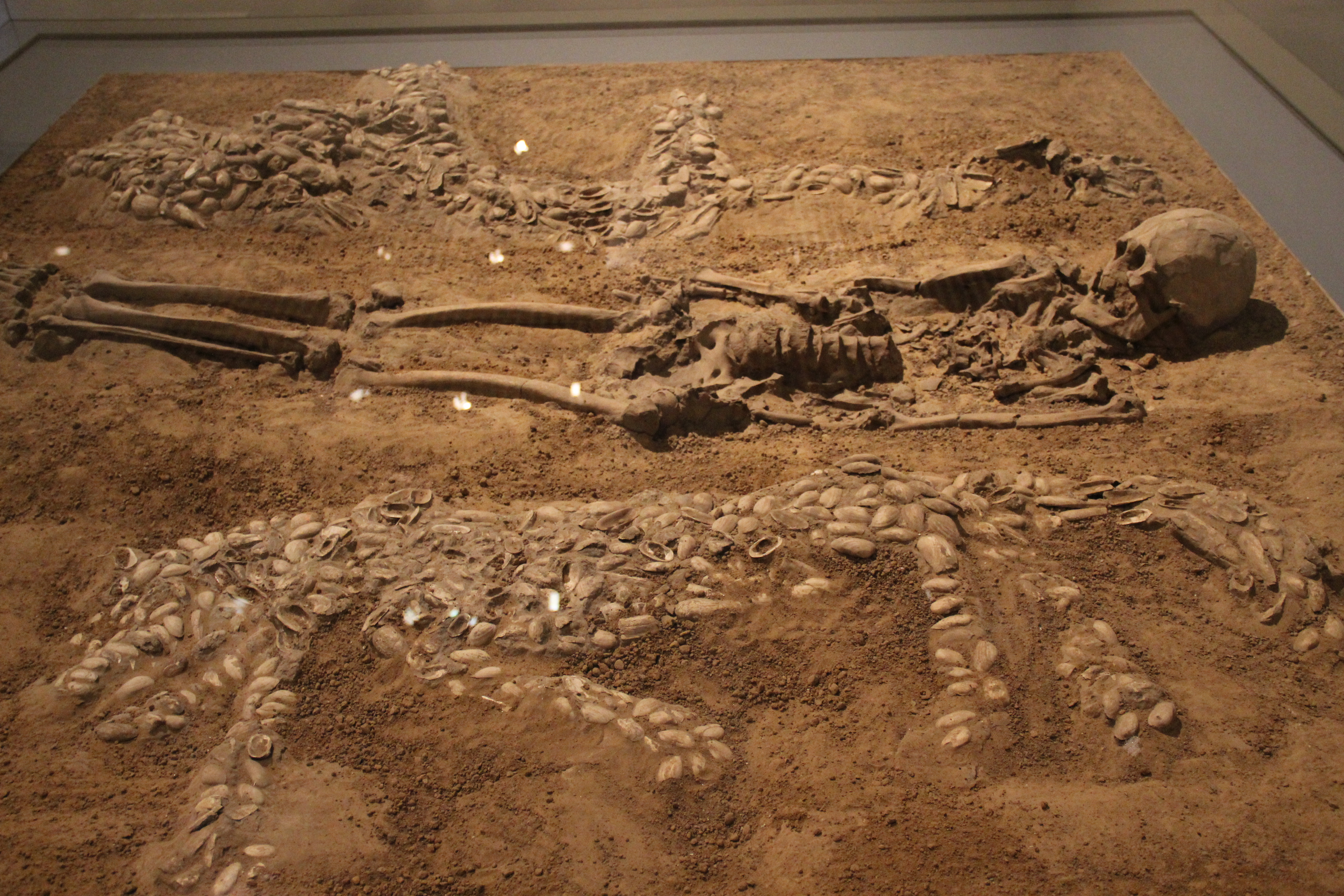
Puyang dragon burial in Xishuipo, supposedly the earliest depiction of a dragon in ancient China, Yangshao culture

== See also ==
- List of Neolithic cultures of China
- Dawenkou culture
- Hemudu culture
- Majiayao culture
- Majiabang culture
- Hongshan culture
- Beifudi
- Xishuipo

== Sources ==
- Chang, Kwang-chih (1986), The Archaeology of Ancient China (4th ed.), Yale University Press, ISBN 978-0-300-03782-1.
- Fiskesjö, Magnus; Chen, Xingcan (2004), China Before China: Johan Gunnar Andersson, Ding Wenjiang, and the Discovery of China's Prehistory, Stockholm: Museum of Far Eastern Antiquities, ISBN 978-91-970616-3-6.
- Li, Xinwei (2013), "The later Neolithic in the central Yellow River valley, c.4000–3000 BC", in Underhill, Anne P. (ed.), A Companion to Chinese Archaeology, John Wiley & Sons, pp. 213–235, ISBN 978-1-118-32578-0.
- Liu, Li; Chen, Xingcan (2012), The Archaeology of China: From the Late Paleolithic to the Early Bronze Age, Cambridge University Press, ISBN 978-0-521-64310-8.
- Underhill, Anne P. (2002), Craft Production and Social Change in Northern China, Springer, ISBN 978-0-306-46771-4.
- Feng, Li (2013), Early China: A Social and Cultural History, Cambridge: Cambridge University Press, ISBN 978-0-521-89552-1
- Shen, Fuwei; Rui, Lyu (2024), Cultural Communications Between China and The Outside World Throughout History, Singapore: Palgrave Macmillan, doi:10.1007/978-981-97-4696-5, ISBN 978-981-97-4695-8
- Zhu, Yanping (2013), "The early Neolithic in the central Yellow River valley, c.7000–4000 BC", in Underhill, Anne P. (ed.), A Companion to Chinese Archaeology, John Wiley & Sons, pp. 172–193, ISBN 978-1-118-32578-0.
- Zhu, Yuqiang (2025), "Exploring the Issue of Western and Local Perspectives on Yangshao Culture", Advances in Education, Humanities and Social Science Research, 13, Atlantis Press: 529–531, ISSN 2790-167X
- Sagart, Laurent; Jacques, Guillaume; Lai, Yunfan; Ryder, Robin; Thouzeau, Valentin; Greenhill, Simon J.; List, Johann-Mattis (2019), "Dated language phylogenies shed light on the history of Sino-Tibetan", Proceedings of the National Academy of Sciences of the United States of America, 116 (21): 10317–10322, doi:10.1073/pnas.1817972116, PMC 6534992, PMID 31061123.
  - "Origin of Sino-Tibetan language family revealed by new research". ScienceDaily (Press release). May 6, 2019.
