= Cishan culture =

6500–5000 BC north Chinese archaeological culture

Coordinates: 36.7°N 114.2°E

- Geographical range: Hebei, Henan
- Period: Neolithic China
- Dates: 6500–5000 BC
- Type site: Cishan
- Major sites: Beifudi
- Preceded by: Nanzhuangtou
- Followed by: Yangshao culture

Chinese name
- Chinese: 磁山文化
Transcriptions
Standard Mandarin
- Hanyu Pinyin: Císhān wénhuà

The Cishan culture (6500–5000 BC) was a Neolithic culture in northern China, on the eastern foothills of the Taihang Mountains. The Cishan culture was based on the farming of broomcorn millet, the cultivation of which on one site has been dated back 10,000 years. The people at Cishan also began to cultivate foxtail millet around 8700 years ago. However, these early dates have been questioned by some archaeologists due to sampling issues and lack of systematic surveying.

Cishan ceramics consist of pots, pot supports, jars, plates, cups and tripods, decorated by cord-wrapped paddle and incising or trailing. Unearthed tools were made of stone, bone and shell, including axes, adzes, chisels, spades, arrowheads, harpoons, and a small number of stone sickles, which may have been used for harvesting cereals.

Since the culture shared many similarities with its southern neighbor, the Peiligang culture, both cultures were sometimes previously referred to together as the Cishan-Peiligang culture or Peiligang-Cishan culture. The Cishan culture also shared several similarities with its eastern neighbor, the Beixin culture. However, the contemporary consensus among archaeologists is that the Cishan people were members of a distinct culture that shared many characteristics with its neighbors.

This culture has been linked to the origin of the Sino-Tibetan language family.

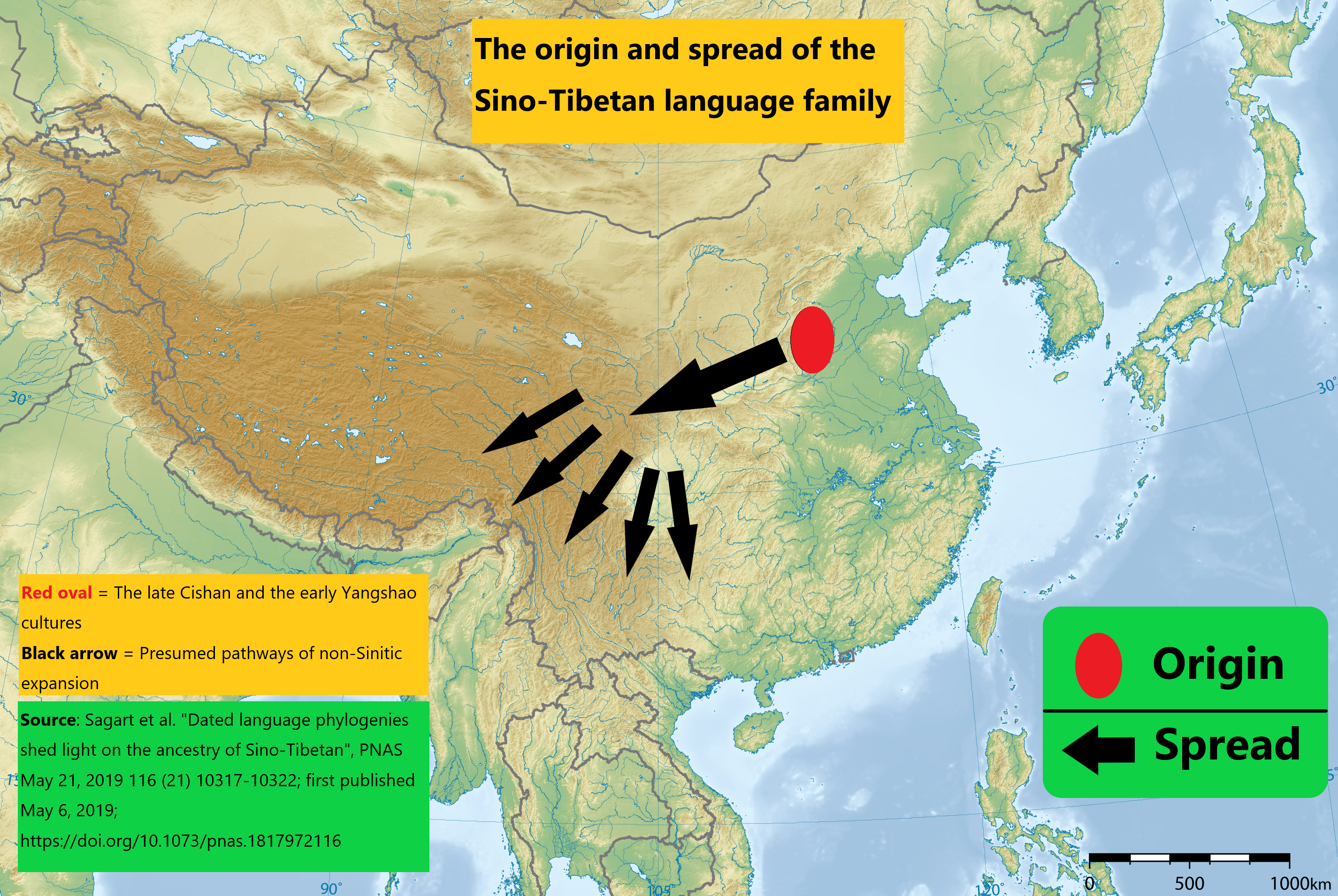
Red oval is the late Cishan and the early Yangshao cultures. After applying the linguistic comparative method to the database of comparative linguistic data developed by Laurent Sagart in 2019 to identify sound correspondences and establish cognates, phylogenetic methods are used to infer relationships among these languages and estimate the age of their origin and homeland.

== Cishan type site ==
The type site at Cishan is located in Wu'an, Hebei, China on a low elevation mesa. The site covers an area of around 80,000 m^{2} (861,113 sq ft). The houses at Cishan were semi-subterranean and round. The site showed evidence of domesticated pigs, dogs and chickens, with pigs providing the primary source of meat. The Cishan people hunted deer and wild boar. Nuts (Juglans regia and Corylus heterophylla), Celtis bungeana, wild apricots and pears, and various roots and tubers were foraged from the surrounding forests. Fish was also an important part of the diet at Cishan, specifically carp and herring from the nearby river; fishing nets made from hemp fibers were used.

Over 500 subterranean storage pits were discovered at Cishan. These pits were used to store millet. The largest pits were 5 meters deep and capable of storing up to 1,000 kg (2,205 lb) of millet.

Artifacts from the Cishan site

Yu (盂) pot and pot supports

Grinding slab and handstone

Bone harpoons

== See also ==
- List of Neolithic cultures of China
- Dadiwan culture
- Beifudi
- Proto-Sino-Tibetan language
