= Jiangzhai =

- 姜寨遗址 (Japanese)
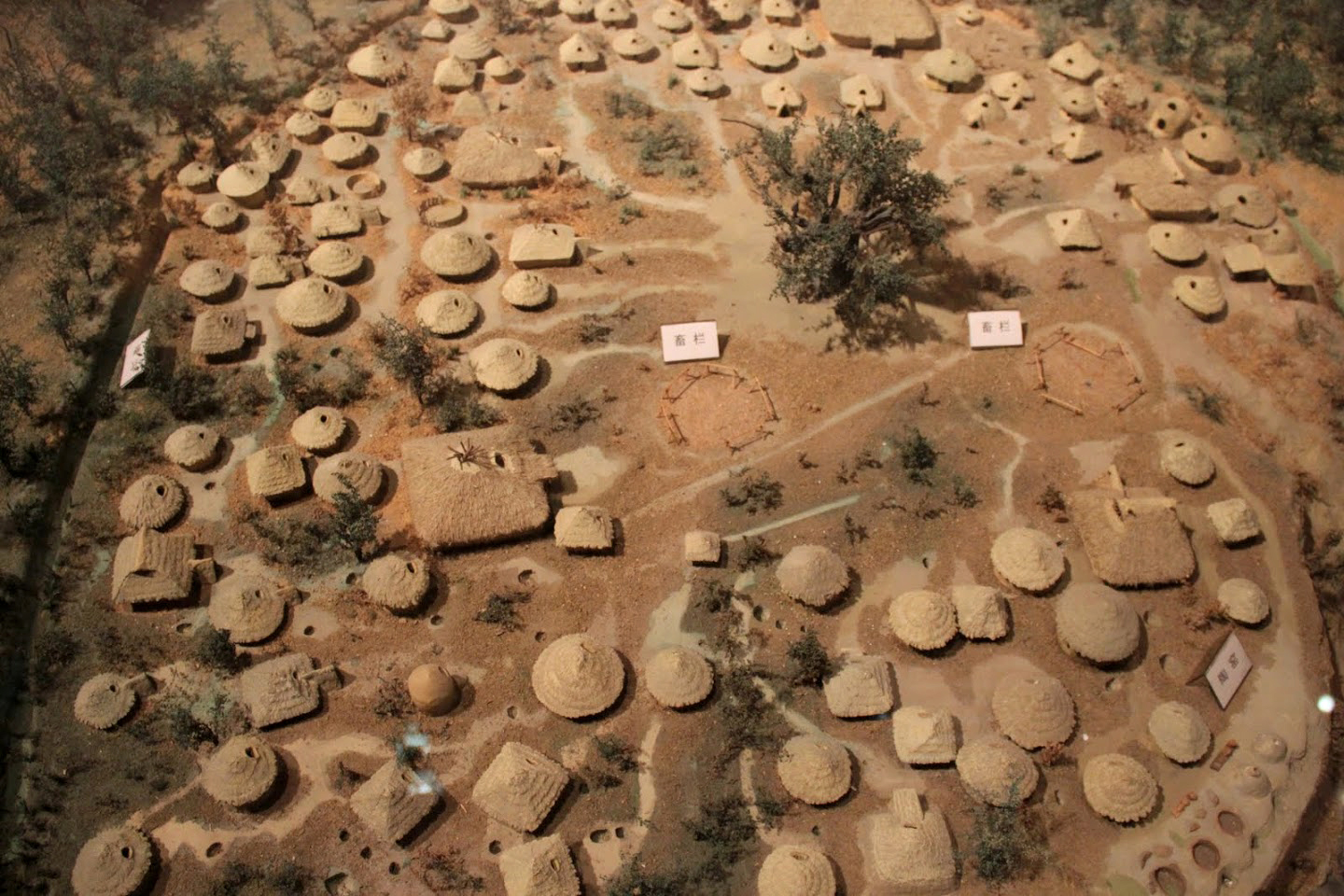
- A scale model of Jiangzhai in the National Museum of China, Beijing
- Interactive map of Jiangzhai
- 34.38053°N 109.20461°E
- Type: Settlement
- Location: Xi'an, Shaanxi, China

History
- Built: c. 4700 BC
- Abandoned: c. 4400 BC

Site notes
- Discovered: 1972

Jiangzhai (Chinese: 姜寨; pinyin: Jiāngzhài) is a Banpo phase Yangshao culture archaeological site in the east of Xi'an, where the earliest copper artifacts in China were found.

== Site ==
The Jiangzhai site is located on the east bank of the Lin River in Lintong District, Xi'an, Shaanxi, only 15 km (9.3 mi) east of the Banpo site and about 30 km (19 mi) from the center of Xi'an. Excavated between 1972 and 1979, it is a prehistoric settlement site of the Neolithic period in the Yellow River basin. The Jiangzhai site was founded around 4700 BC and contains the remains of five different cultural phases of the Neolithic Yangshao culture, such as the Hanpo type, Shijia type, Miaodigou type, Xiwangcun type, and KeShanZhuang II type of the Longshan culture. It is the largest and most complete Neolithic village site discovered so far in the Yellow River basin. Of the site, 16,580 m^{2} has been excavated, resulting in the discovery of 600 tombs and 10,000 objects of interest, most of them being utensils such as pottery and bone utensils. Some brass artifacts were also found, the oldest copper artifacts found in China. The total area of the site is estimated at 50,000 m^{2}, and consisted of a village with around 100 homes.The homes were built with simple materials, for example, bamboos.

== Brass ==
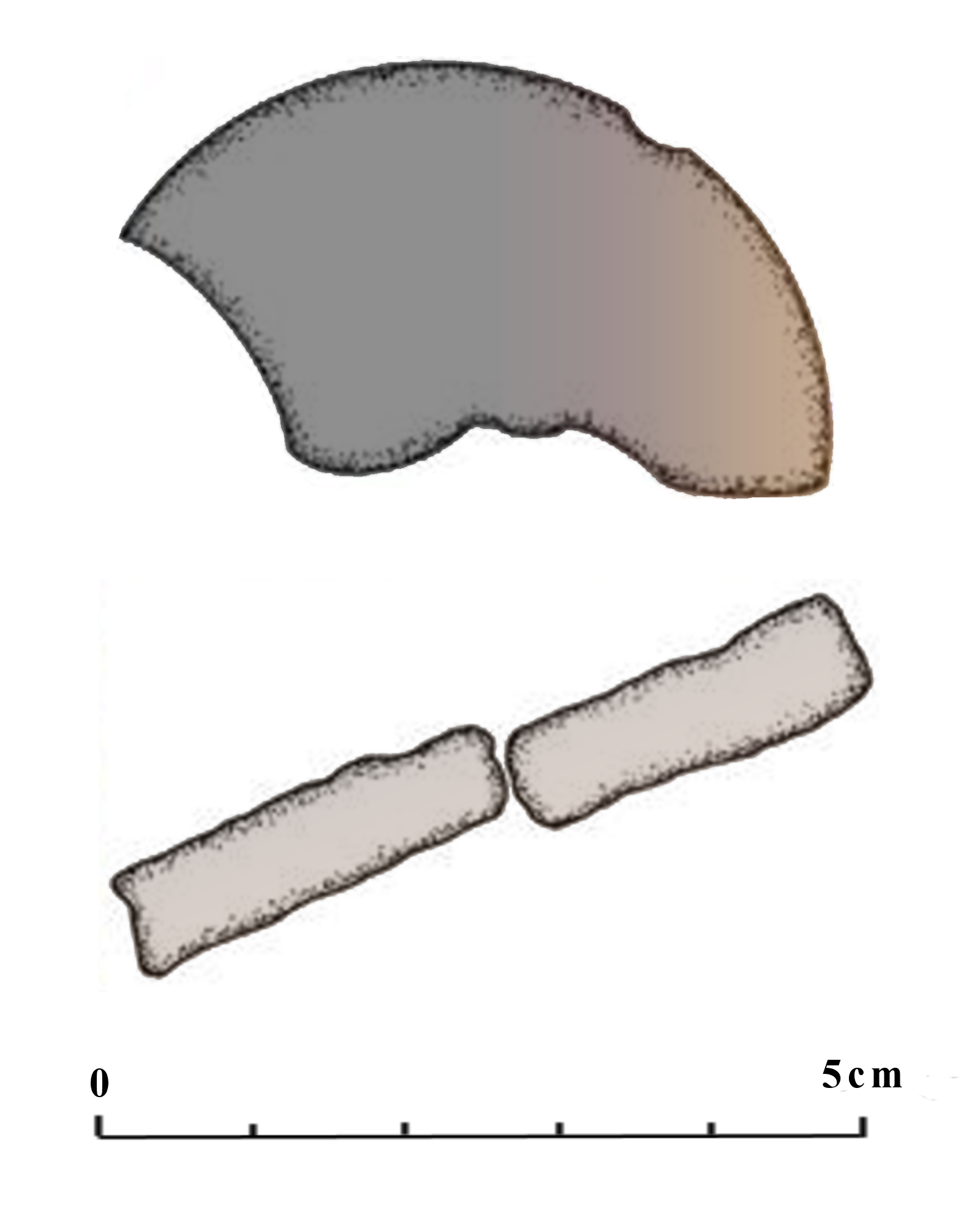
Brass artifacts excavated from Jiangzhai. Dated to ca. 4700–ca. 4000 BCE

Some in China claim the brass found in Jiangzhai is the oldest arsenical copper ever found, dated to 4700–4000 BC. However, the brass found at the site has been described as "very suspicious", with suggestions that it resulted from accidental mixing from the upper stratigraphy. Evidence from only two pieces of metal was deemed far from sufficient to establish the initial stage of the Chinese Metal Age, while the absence of comparable brass finds for thousands of years afterward has also been cited as grounds for questioning the finds.

In 1996, the Jiangzhai site was designated by the State Council as one of national key cultural relics protection sites. As of September 2013, the Jiangzhai site was still in a mediocre state of protection, with only a concrete plaque above the ground identifying the National Key Cultural Relics Protection Unit, and the modern buildings above the ground being demolished.

== See also ==
- Chalcolithic (Copper age)
