= Dadiwan culture =

5800–5400 BC Chinese archaeological culture

Coordinates: 35.011331°N 105.909813°E

- Geographical range: Gansu, Shaanxi
- Period: Neolithic
- Dates: 5800–5400 BC
- Type site: Dadiwan
- Followed by: Yangshao culture

Chinese name
- Traditional Chinese: 大地灣文化
Transcriptions

The Dadiwan culture (c. 5800 – 5400 BC) was a Neolithic culture located primarily in the eastern portion of Gansu and Shaanxi provinces in modern China. The culture takes its name from the deepest cultural layer found during the original excavation of the type site at Dadiwan. The remains of millet, pigs and dogs have been found in sites associated with the culture, which is itself defined by a thin-walled, cord-marked ceramic tradition sometimes referred to as Laoguantai. The Dadiwan culture shares a variety of common features, in pottery, architecture, and economy, with the Cishan and Peiligang cultures to the east.

== Type site ==
The Dadiwan type site in Qin'an County, Gansu sits atop a fan toe produced by a gully that drains into the Qingshui River valley, itself a tributary of the Wei River. The site was originally excavated from 1975 to 1984, and again in 2004, 2006, and 2009. The most recent excavations reveal that humans had occupied the location sporadically for at least the last 60,000 years. The Neolithic cultural sequence here begins with the Dadiwan culture (c. 7900–7200 BP), followed by the Yangshao culture (c. 6800–4900 BP) and then the Changshan culture (c. 4900–4800 BP). The agricultural economy intensified and flourished during the early phases of the Yangshao culture.

The foundation of a large building, measuring 290 and 420 m^{2} (3,100 and 4,500 sq ft) when including the outer courtyard, was discovered at Dadiwan. The building, known as F901, is described by Chinese archaeologists as a communal meeting hall. The building was built on an elevated rammed earth foundation, which was then layered with burnt clay.

The site has continued to produce new information about the Dadiwan culture. For example, biogeochemical analyses reported in 2013 reveal that dogs living at Dadiwan from 7900 to 4900 cal BP likely consumed C4 carbon fixation plants throughout the year. Because all other wild animals (like deer and bear) found at the site only consumed C3 plants, it suggests that the natural year-round vegetation was dominated by C3 plants. The only way that dog bones would contain strong C4 signals was if they consumed a rare plant year-round. A likely candidate for this is millet (a C4 grass); and because millet only grows in the summer, the only way that dogs could eat it year round is if humans were feeding it to them. Therefore, this represents some of the earliest evidence for agricultural production (cultivation, harvesting, and storing of seed crops) in East Asia.

== See also ==
- Majiayao culture
- Qijia culture
- List of Neolithic cultures of China
