= Nanzhuangtou =

Archaeological site in China

- 南莊頭 (Chinese)
- location in China
- 39.1167°N 115.65°E
- Periods: Neolithic China
- Location: Hebei
- Region: North China Plain

History
- Built: 12,600 BP
- Abandoned: 11,300 BP

Nanzhuangtou (Chinese: 南莊頭, Nánzhuāngtóu), dated to 12,600.00–11,300 cal BP or 11,500–11,000 cal BP, roughly 9,500–9,000 BC, or 10,700–9,500 BP, roughly 8,700–7,500 BC, is an Initial Neolithic site near Lake Baiyangdian in Xushui County, Hebei, China. The site was discovered under a peat bog. Over 47 pieces of pottery were discovered at the site. Nanzhuangtou is also the earliest Neolithic site yet discovered in northern China. There is evidence that the people at Nanzhuangtou had domestic dogs 10,000 years ago. Stone grinding slabs and rollers and bone artifacts were also discovered at the site. It is one of the earliest sites showing evidence of millet cultivation dating to 10,500 BP. Pottery can also be dated to 10,200 BP.

The site was discovered in 1986, when a cultural layer of unearthed animal bones, charcoal, and stone tools was discovered. The layer was 180 centimeters below the ground, which is covered with lake deposits such as thick black and gray silt clay. Three archaeological excavations have been carried out so far by institutions such as the Department of Archaeology in Peking University, the Department of History in Hebei University, the Hebei Provincial Institute of Cultural Relics, and other cultural institutions in the city and county level.

The Early Neolithic period (7,000 BC–5,000 BC) succeeds Nanzhuangtou, and is characterized by the rise of farming villages across the alluvial plains of China, as seen in the site of Peiligang.

== Citations ==
=== Bibliography ===
- Allan, Sarah (ed), The Formation of Chinese Civilization: An Archaeological Perspective, ISBN 0-300-09382-9
- Liu, Li. The Chinese Neolithic: Trajectories to Early States, ISBN 0-521-81184-8
- Sagart, Laurent, Roger Blench and Alicia Sanchez-Mazas (eds), The Peopling of East Asia ISBN 0-415-32242-1
- Stark, Miriam T. (ed), Archaeology of Asia, ISBN 1-4051-0213-6
- Yang, Xiaoyan et al., Early millet use in northern China, Proceedings of the National Academy of Sciences of the United States of America, vol. 109 no. 10, 3726–3730, doi: 10.1073/pnas.1115430109
