= Xishuipo =

Archaeological site in Puyang, China

Coordinates: 35.7°N 115°E

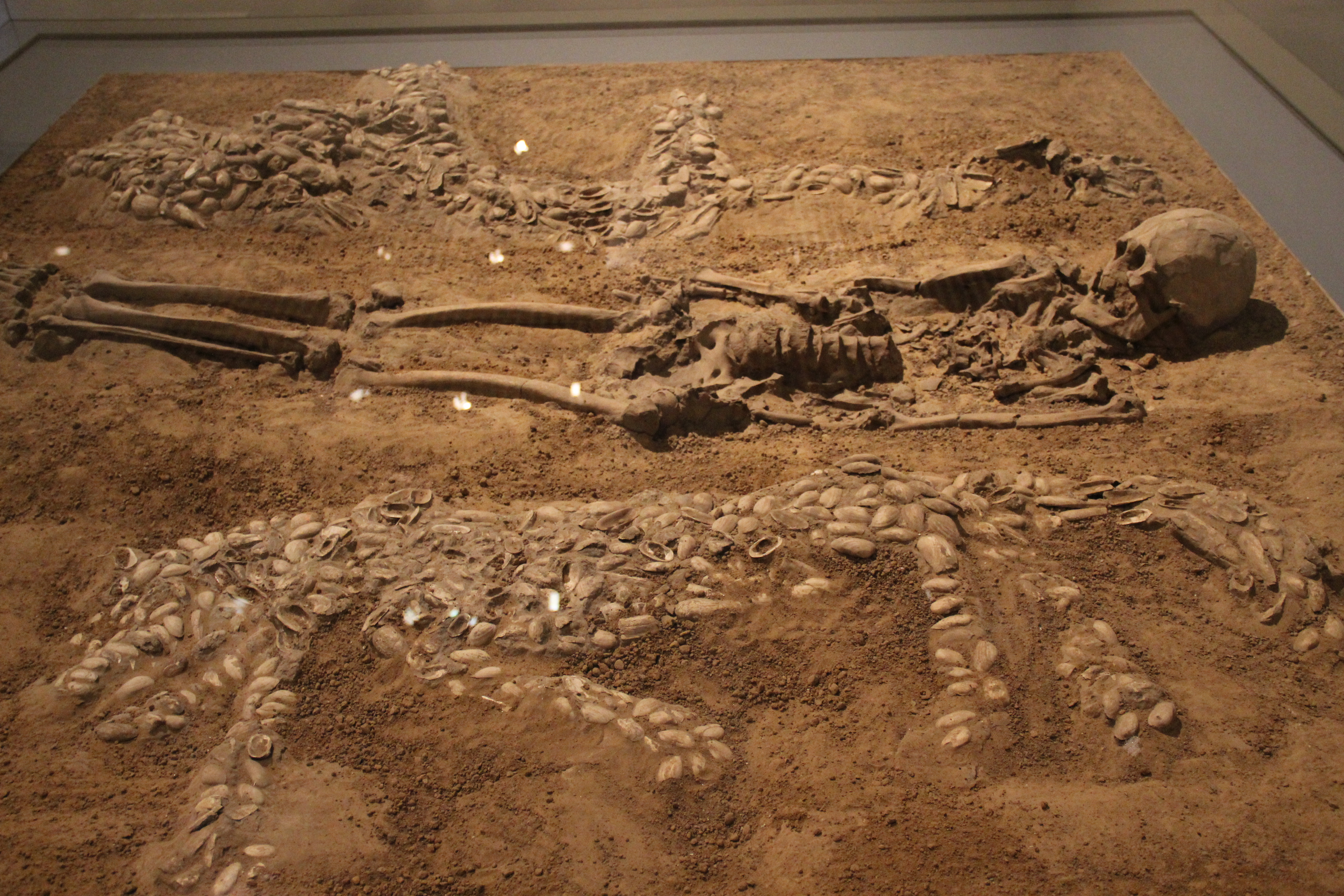
Puyang dragon burial, supposedly the earliest depiction of a dragon in ancient China, Yangshao culture

Xishuipo (Chinese: 西水坡; Pinyin: Xīshuǐpō) is a Neolithic site in Puyang, Henan, central China, associated with the Yangshao culture. The site was excavated from 1987 to 1988; 186 burials were discovered at the site.

In one of the burials, tomb M45, the body of a tall adult male was flanked by two mosaics formed from white clam shells, a tiger design to the right, and a dragon design to the left. Clam shell mosaics were also found in two nearby caches. The burial was accompanied by the bodies of three young children. Some archaeologists believe that the man was a shaman.
