= Yangshao, Mianchi =

Yangshao 仰韶镇
- Town
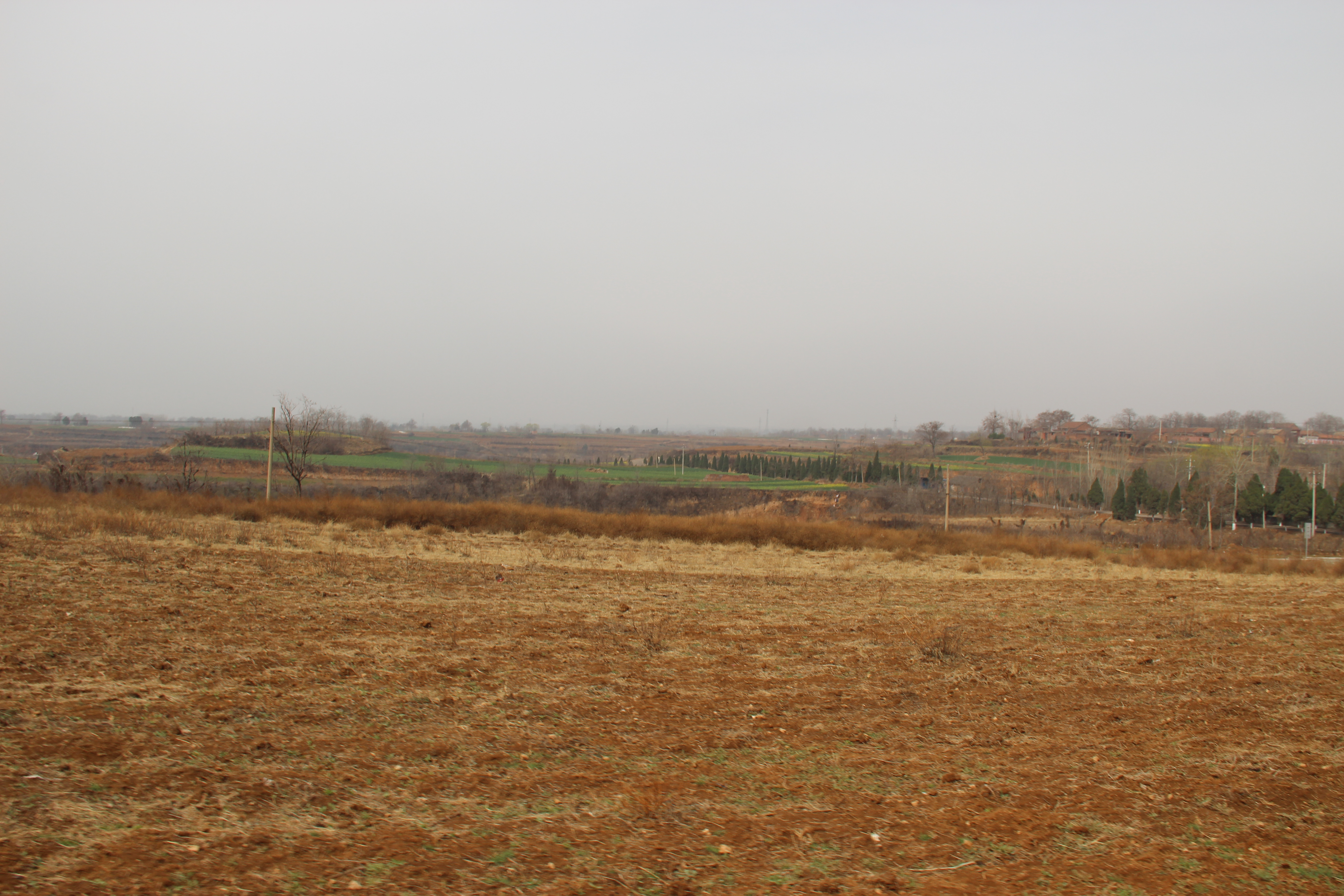

- Location in China and Henan Yangshao (Henan)
- Coordinates: 34°45′53″N 111°45′37″E
- Country: China
- Province: Henan
- Prefecture-level city: Sanmenxia
- County: Mianchi

Area
  - Total: 90.27 km^{2} (34.85 sq mi)

Population
  - Total: 35,914

Yangshao is a town of Mianchi County, Sanmenxia, Henan, China. Before 2011, it was known as Yangshao township.

It is known for the first archeological site of the Yangshao culture and for Yangshaojiu Baijiu.
