= Peiligang culture =

7000–5000 BC Chinese archaeological culture

- Geographical range: Henan, China
- Period: Neolithic China
- Dates: 7000–5000 BC
- Type site: Peiligang
- Major sites: Tanghu, Jiahu
- Preceded by: Nanzhuangtou Culture
- Followed by: Yangshao culture

Chinese name
- Chinese: 裴李崗文化
- Traditional Chinese: 裴李崗文化
Transcriptions
Standard Mandarin
- Hanyu Pinyin: Péilǐgāng Wénhuà

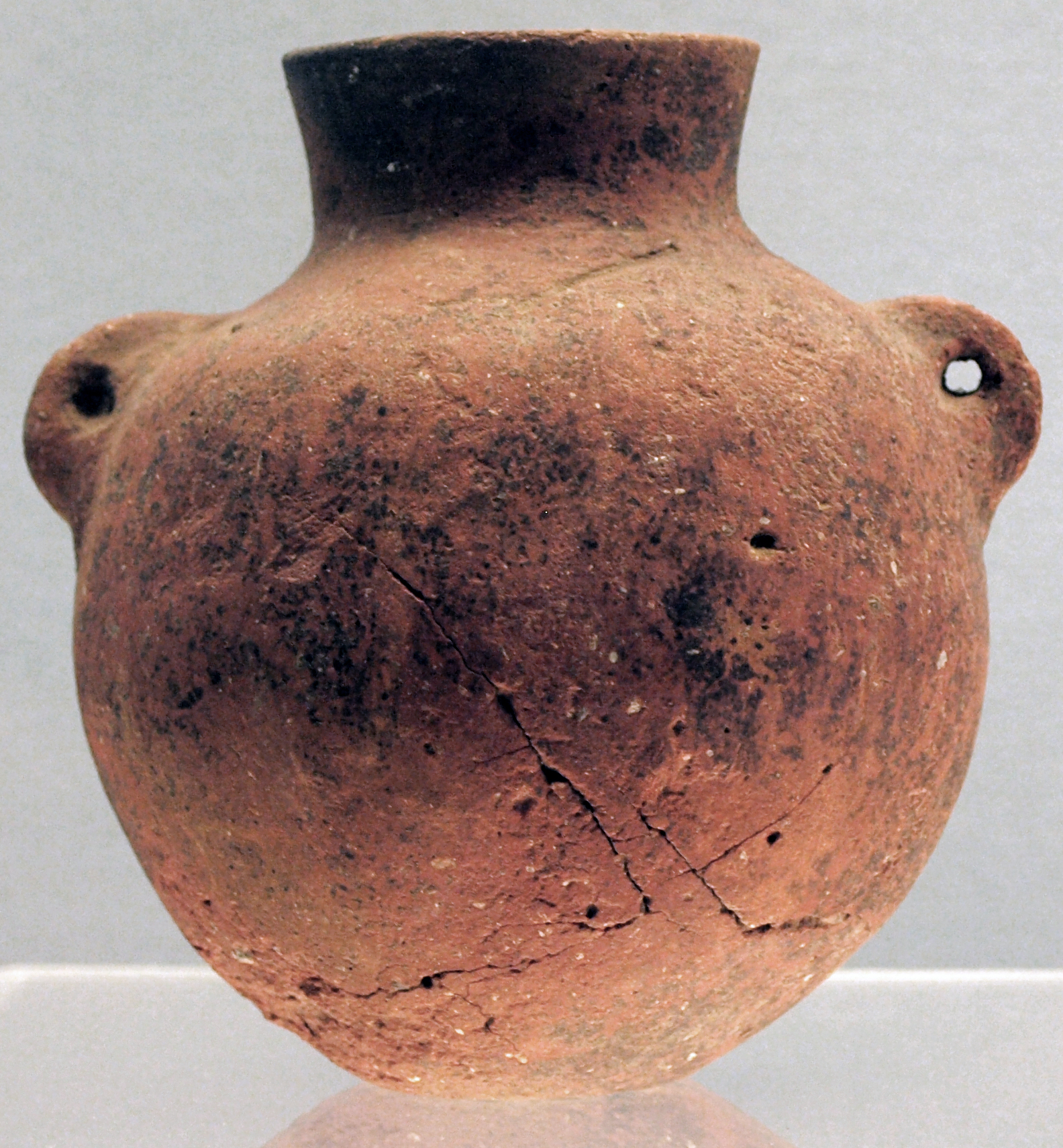
Red pot with two small "ear" handles, from the Peiligang culture, c. 6000–5200 BC

The Peiligang culture was a Neolithic culture in the Yi-Luo river basin (in modern Henan Province, China) that existed from about 7000 to 5000 BC. Over 100 sites have been identified with the Peiligang culture, nearly all of them in a fairly compact area of about 100 square kilometers in the area just south of the river and along its banks.

== Peiligang culture ==
The culture is named after the site discovered in 1977 at Peiligang, a village in Xinzheng County, Zhengzhou, north-central Henan province. Archaeologists believe that the Peiligang culture was egalitarian, with little political organization.

The culture practiced agriculture in the form of cultivating millet and animal husbandry in the form of raising pigs and possibly poultry. The people hunted deer and wild boar, and fished for carp in the nearby river, using nets made from hemp fibers. The culture is also one of the oldest in ancient China to make pottery. This culture typically had separate residential and burial areas, or cemeteries, like most Neolithic cultures. Common artifacts include stone arrowheads, spearheads and axe heads; stone tools such as chisels, awls and sickles for harvesting grain; and a broad assortment of pottery items for such purposes as cooking and storing grain.

== Jiahu ==
The site at Jiahu is the earliest site associated with Peiligang culture. There are many similarities between the main group of Peiligang settlements and the Jiahu culture, which was isolated several days' travel to the south of the main group. Archaeologists are divided about the relationship between Jiahu and the main group. Most agree that Jiahu was part of the Peiligang culture, pointing to the many similarities. A few archaeologists are pointing to the differences, as well as the distance, believing that Jiahu was a neighbor that shared many cultural characteristics with Peiligang, but was a separate culture. The cultivation of rice, for example, was unique to Jiahu and was not practiced among the villages of the main Peiligang group in the north. Also, Jiahu existed for several hundred years before any of the settlements of the main group.

== Gallery ==
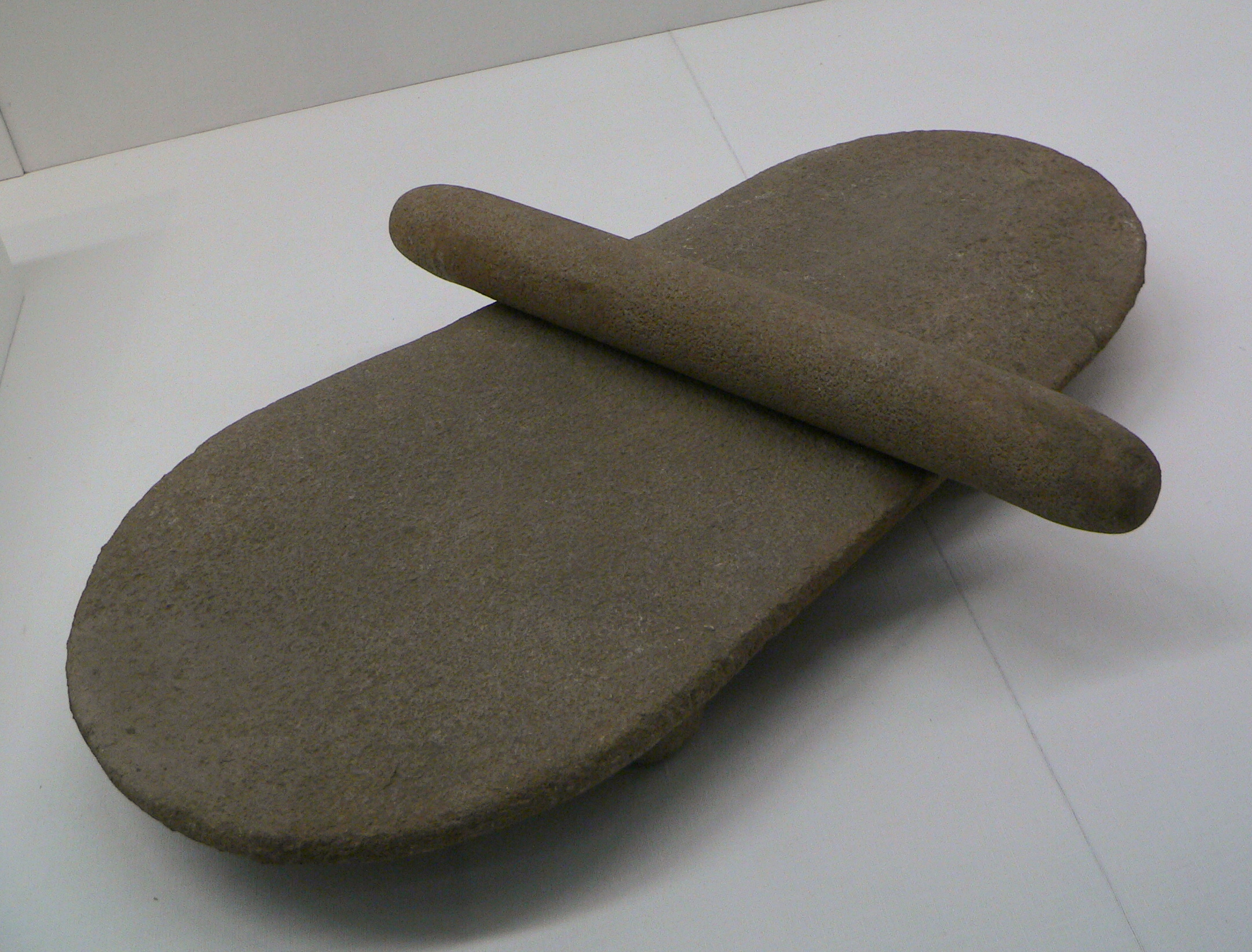
Stone roller and quern from the Peiligang site

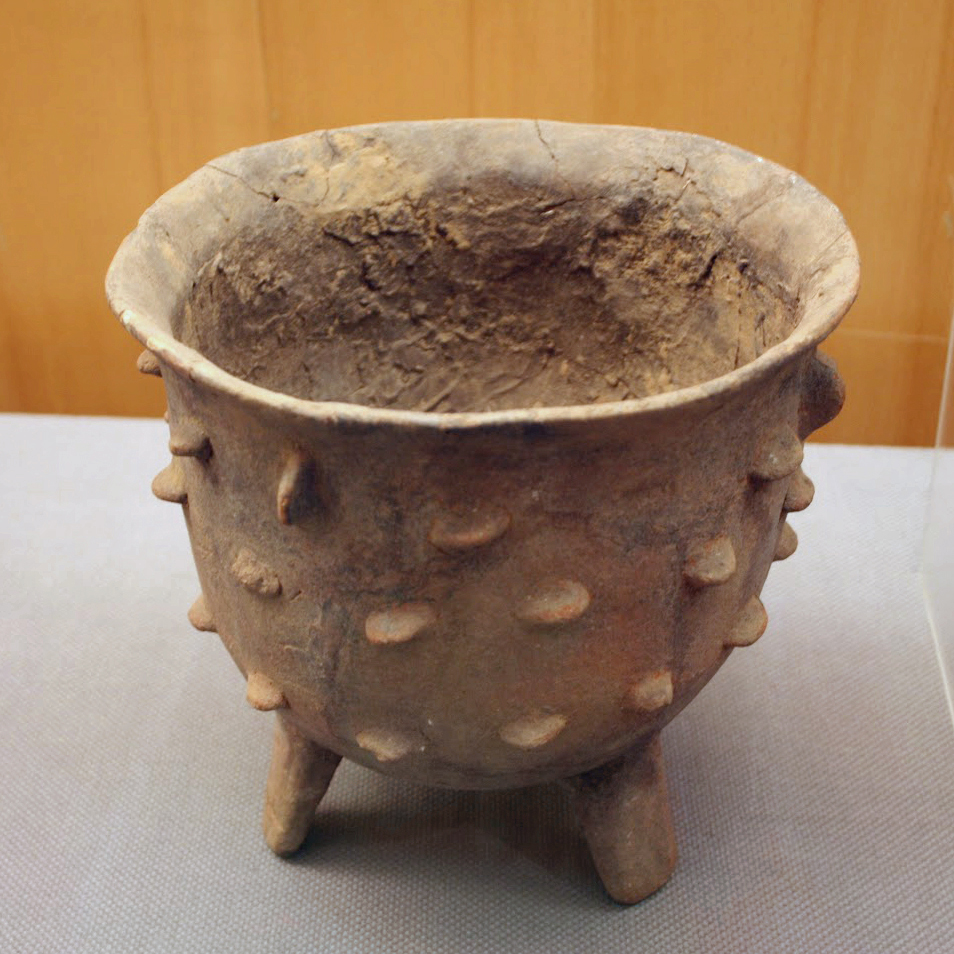
Ding, Peiligang. Henan provincial museum

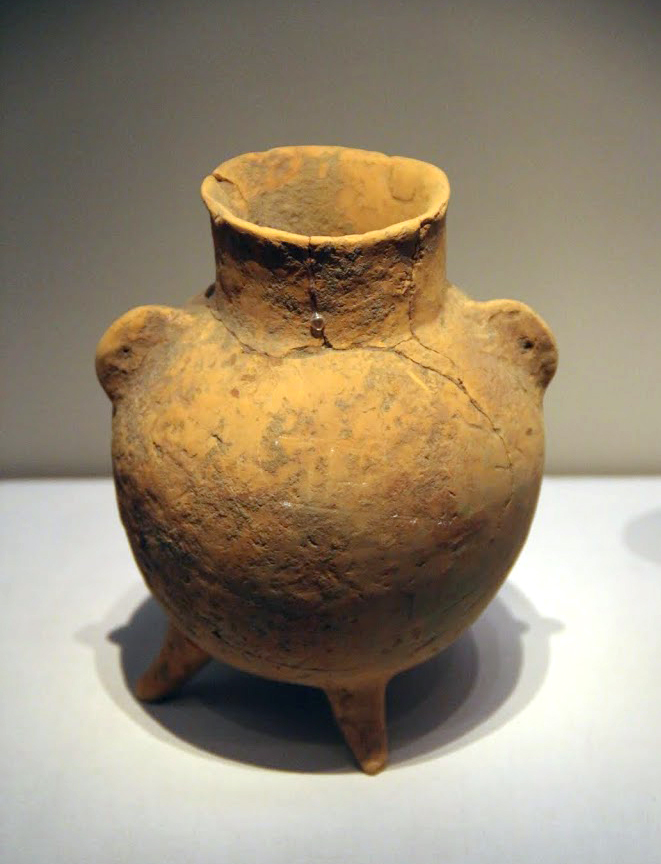
Neolithic pottery jar, Peiligang Culture, Xinzheng, Henan

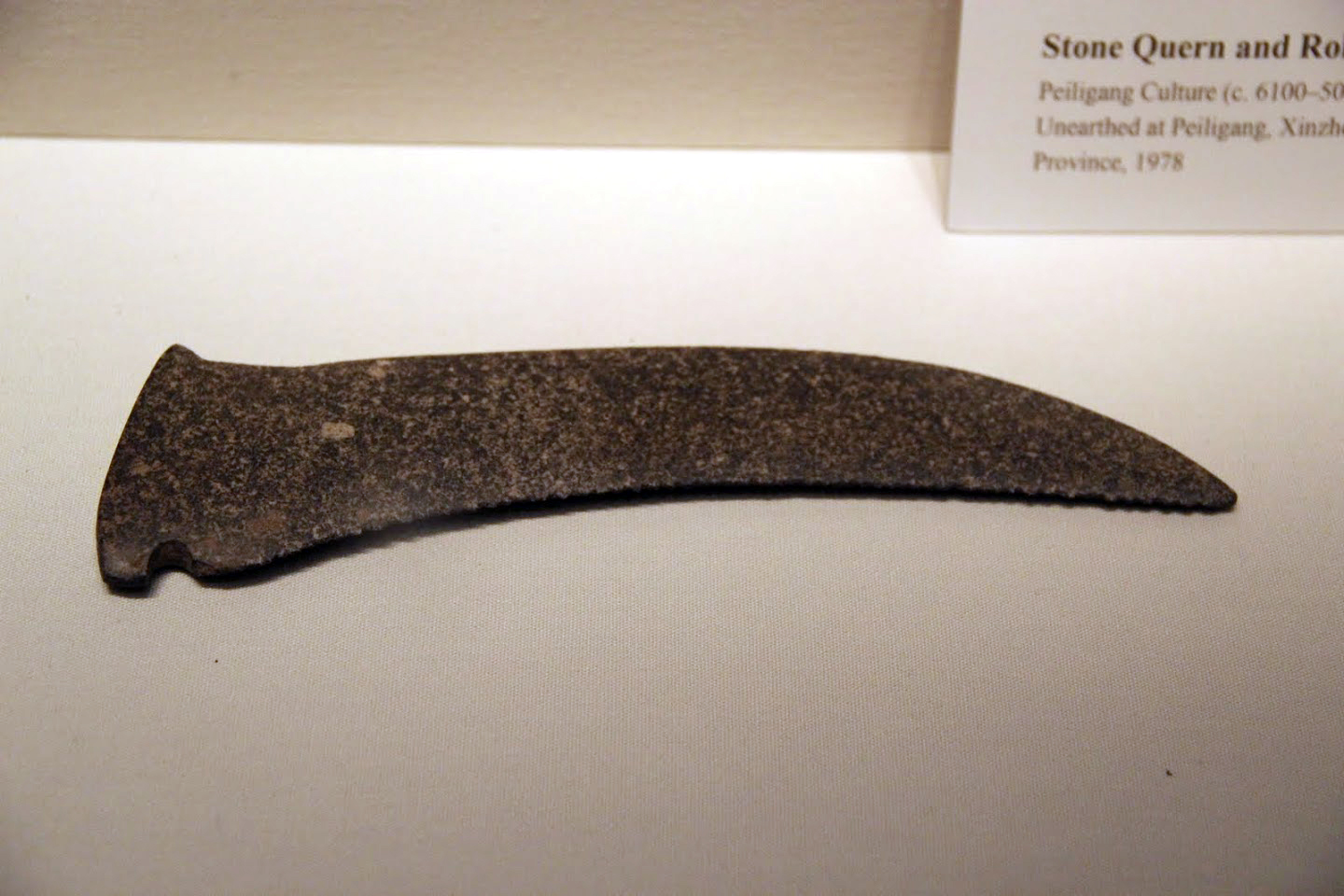
Neolithic stone sickle, Peiligang Culture, Jiaxian, Henan

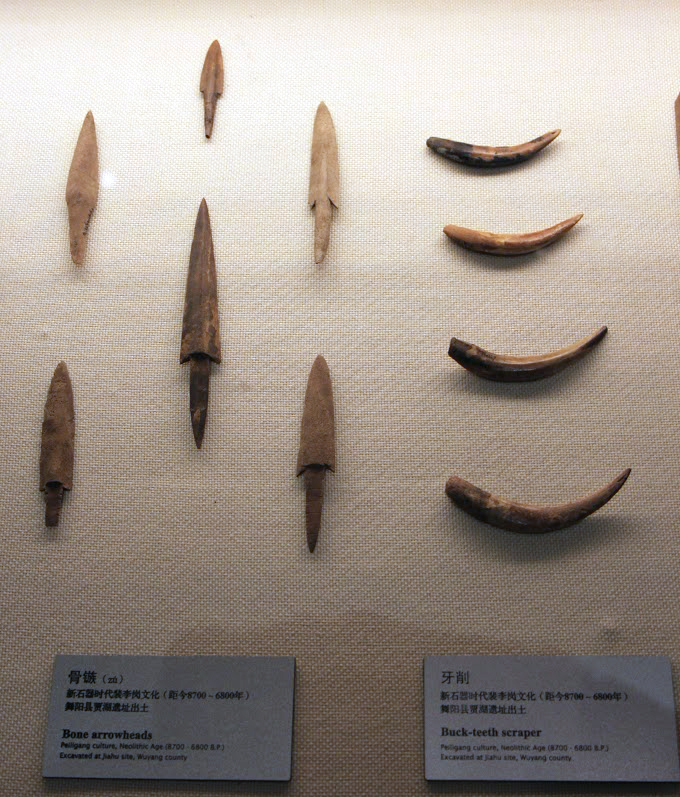
Peiligang Culture bone arrowheads & teeth scrapers

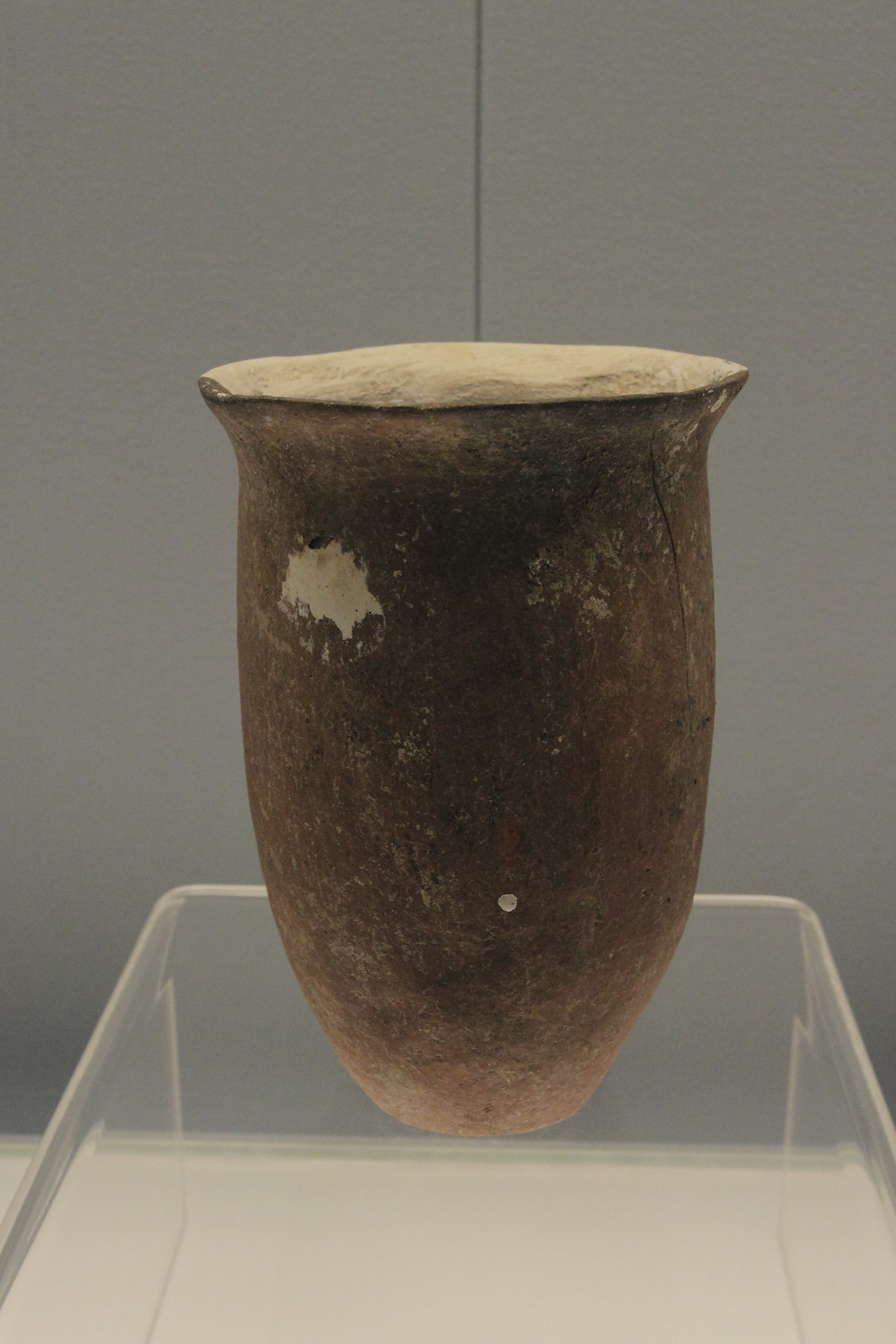
Red Pottery Jar with a Deep Belley, Peiligang culture

== See also ==
- Jiahu symbols
- Prehistoric Beifudi site

== Bibliography ==
- Liu, Li (2004). The Chinese Neolithic: Trajectories to Early States. Cambridge University Press. pp. 74–78. ISBN 978-0-521-81184-2.
- Liu, Li; Chen, Xingcan (2012). The Archaeology of China: From the Late Paleolithic to the Early Bronze Age. Cambridge University Press. pp. 141–150. ISBN 978-0-521-64310-8.
