= Beifudi =

Archaeological site

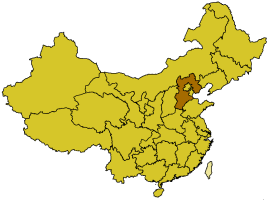
Location of Hebei Province

Beifudi (Chinese: 北福地) is an archaeological site and Neolithic village in Yi County, Hebei, China. The site, an area of 3 ha on the northern bank of the Yishui River, contains artifacts of a culture contemporaneous with the Cishan and Xinglongwa cultures of about 8000–7000 BP, two known Neolithic cultures east of the Taihang Mountains, and thus fills an archaeological gap between the two Northern Chinese cultures. The total excavated area is more than 1,200 square meters and the collection of Neolithic findings at the site has been conducted in two phases.

This archaeological site was voted Number One in the Top Ten most outstanding archaeological findings in 2004 by Chinese archaeologists in their annual poll.

== Findings ==
The most significant discovery in the first phase of the site's excavation is the large number of pottery masks in the shape of human and animal faces, the oldest extant carvings to date. A dozen carved clay masks, in cat, monkey and pig as well as human likenesses, have been unearthed at Beifudi. One mask of a human face has a mouth and nose in carved relief and the eyes are pierced out. The first engraved clay artifacts ever found in ruins of this age, the masks add several millennia to China's history of carving.

These artifacts, along with raised platforms, or altars, may provide information on various early religious practices. Although the beliefs of these Neolithic people are not known, the early Chinese almost certainly performed ritual ceremonial sacrifices and burned burials (fanyi) on the raised platforms, as both human and animal burials have been found. The masks are believed to be part of the ritual performances accompanying sacrifices and burials.

Excavations in the second phase, dating to 6500–7000 BP include pottery and stone tools, ceramic pots (including the round-bottom fu vessel, the vessel seat, and the bo bowl) and small-mouth-double-handled pots. Archaeologists have unearthed the ruins of ten well-preserved cave shelters concentrated in one location, arranged systematically with cooking and living areas located in the center of the dwellings. Artifacts excavated from dwellings include stone blocks, building materials, and broken pottery. Ash pits, and sacrificial sites have been excavated as well as pieces of jade and very well preserved carved ceramic masks.

== Conclusions ==
Drawing on archaeology, geology and anthropology, modern scholars do not see the origins of the Chinese civilization or Chinese history as one story but rather the history of the interactions of many different cultures and many different ethnic groups that influenced each other's development. As the prehistoric Beifudi site is in northern China where the climate is drier than in the south, it is likely that this culture cultivated millet although no direct evidence of cultivation has been found. The finding of stone tools for food processing does not reliably prove that the culture had developed agriculture as such tools were used before the cultivation of crops.

The importance of the prehistoric Beifudi site lies in its potential to provide archaeological information on the beliefs and ceremonial practices of this ancient culture through the ancient carved artifacts found there, as well as further understanding of the beginnings of Chinese architecture.
