= Liu Li (archaeologist) =

Chinese-American archaeologist (born 1953)

Liu Li 刘莉
- Born: December 12, 1953 (age 72)
- Education: Northwest University (China), Temple University, Harvard University
- Known for: Research showing that agricultural technology in Ancient China originated from prototypes in the Upper Paleolithic. Book on The Archaeology of China from the Late Paleolithic to the Early Iron Age.
- Awards: Best Translated Book of the Year in Archaeology, China, Best Translated Book Award (2007)
- Scientific career
- Fields: Archaeology
- Workplaces: Stanford University
- Doctoral advisor: Kwang-chih Chang

Liu Li (Chinese: 刘莉; pinyin: Liú Lì; born December 12, 1953) is a Chinese-American archaeologist most well known for her work on Neolithic and Bronze Age Chinese archaeology. She is Sir Robert Ho Tung Professor in Chinese Archaeology at Stanford University.

== Early life and education ==
Liu was sent to the region near Yan'an in 1969 as part of the government's programme to resettle privileged, urban youth. She took the same train as future paramount leader of China, Xi Jinping.

In 1971, Liu began work at a munitions factory in Tongchuan. In a 2016 interview with Chinese Archaeology Web, she describes manufacturing the same two components of firearms continuously for seven years as, 'incredibly, incredibly boring.'

She was part of the first waves of students to take the National Higher Education Entrance Examination to university when it was reinstated in 1977. Liu applied to Northwest University (China) and completed her undergraduate degree in archaeology in 1982.

Liu attend Temple University in Philadelphia for her master's degree. She then completed her Ph.D. at Harvard University under the preeminent archaeologist Kwang-chih Chang.

== Career ==
In 1996, Liu became a lecturer at La Trobe University in Melbourne, Australia.

In 2010, she became the Sir Robert Ho Tung Professor in Chinese Archaeology at Stanford University.
