= Xiliao River =

Tributary of the Liao river

Coordinates: 42°58′53″N 123°32′50″E

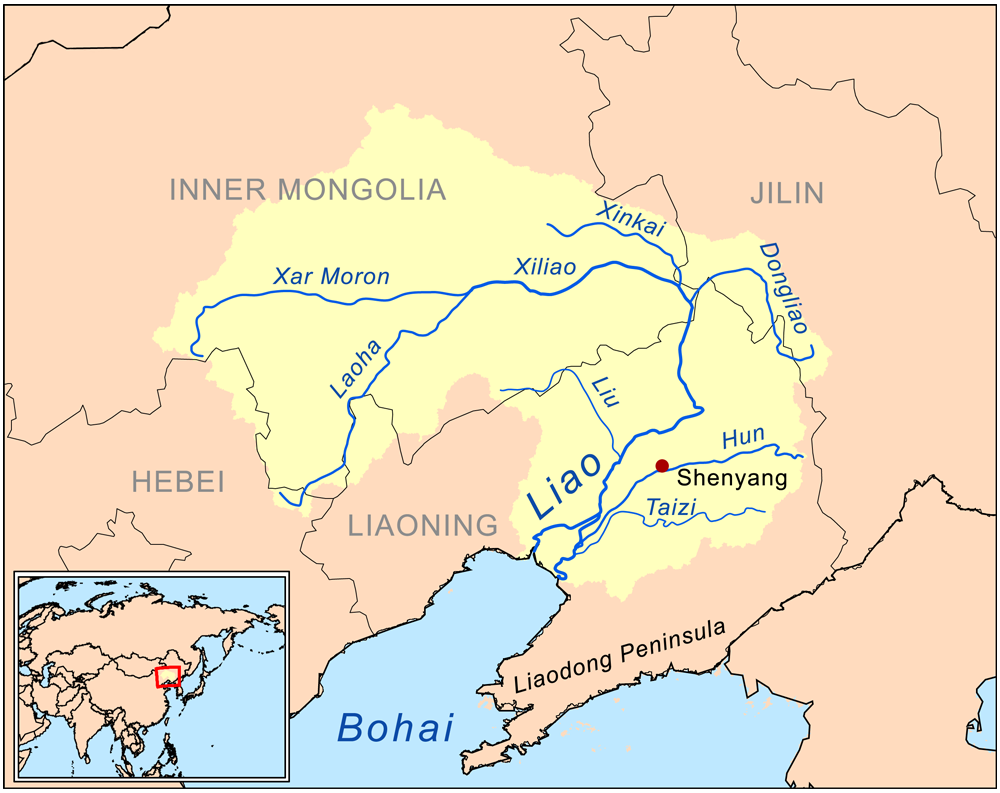
Location of the Xiliao River in China

The Xiliao or West Liao River (simplified Chinese: 西辽河; traditional Chinese: 西遼河; pinyin: Xīliáo Hé) is a river in Inner Mongolia and Liaoning province, in northeast China. Its source is the Xilamulun River in Inner Mongolia. It is one of the headwaters of the Liao River.

The Xiliao or "Western Liao River", historically also known as Huang River (潢水), is the largest tributary of the Liao River. The Xiliao runs 449 kilometres (279 mi), and drains a basin of 136,000 square kilometres (53,000 sq mi). The Xiliao River is formed by the confluence of the Laoha River (老哈河) flowing from the southwest, and the Xar Moron River (西拉木伦河) flowing from the west. The entire course of the Xiliao runs eastward within Inner Mongolia. It is joined at the lower course by a large tributary, the Xinkai River (新开河), which drains the southeast slopes of the Khingan Mountains.

The Xiliao is dry in its upper reaches except after thunderstorms, 8 kilometres (5 mi) north of the city of Shuangliao, before turning southeast to join the Dongliao River to form the Liao River proper near the common border of Liaoning, Jilin and Inner Mongolia.

== Archaeology ==
Various Neolithic cultures have been identified in the Xiliao River region. Broomcorn millet and foxtail millet were the main cereal crops, while pigs and dogs were the main domesticated animals found at Neolithic archaeological sites.

- Xiaohexi culture 小河西文化 (9,000-8,500 BP)
- Xinglongwa culture 兴隆洼文化 (8,200-7,400 BP)
- Zhaobaogou culture 赵宝沟文化 (7,500-6,500 BP)
- Fuhe culture 富河文化 (7,200-7,000 BP)
- Hongshan culture 红山文化 (6,500-5,000 BP)
- Xiaoheyan culture 小河沿文化 (5,000-4,000 BP)

Bronze Age cultures of the Xiliao River region are:

- Lower Xiajiadian culture 夏家店下层文化 (4,000-3,200 BP)
- Upper Xiajiadian culture 夏家店上层文化 (3,200-2,600 BP)
