= List of Neolithic cultures of China =

This is a list of Neolithic cultures of China that have been unearthed by archaeologists. They are sorted in chronological order from earliest to latest and are followed by a schematic visualization of these cultures.

It would seem that the definition of Neolithic in China is undergoing changes. The discovery in 2012 of pottery about 20,000 years BC indicates that this measure alone can no longer be used to define the period. It will fall to the more difficult task of determining when cereal domestication started.

== List ==
Dates (BCE)	English name	Chinese name	Modern-day name and location
18000–7000	Xianren Cave culture (Paleolithic)	仙人洞、吊桶环遗址	Wannian County, Shangrao, Jiangxi
8500–7700	Nanzhuangtou culture	南莊頭遺址	Yellow River region in southern Hebei
7500–6100	Pengtoushan culture	彭頭山文化	central Yangtze region in northwestern Hunan
7000–5000	Peiligang culture	裴李崗文化	Yi-Luo river basin valley in Henan
6500–5500	Houli culture	後李文化	Shandong
6200–5400	Xinglongwa culture	興隆洼文化	Inner Mongolia-Liaoning border
6000–5000	Kuahuqiao culture	跨湖桥文化	Zhejiang
6000–5500	Cishan culture	磁山文化	southern Hebei
5800–5400	Dadiwan culture	大地灣文化	Gansu and western Shaanxi
5500–4800	Xinle culture	新樂文化	lower Liao River on the Liaodong Peninsula
5500–3500	Gaomiao culture	高庙文化	Yangtze River, Hunan
5400–4500	Zhaobaogou culture	趙宝溝文化	Luan River valley in Inner Mongolia and northern Hebei
5300–4100	Beixin culture	北辛文化	Shandong
5000–4500	Hemudu culture	河姆渡文化	Yuyao and Zhoushan, Zhejiang
5000–3000	Daxi culture	大溪文化	Three Gorges region
5000–3000	Majiabang culture	馬家浜文化	Lake Tai area and north of Hangzhou Bay
5000–3000	Yangshao culture	仰韶文化	Henan, Shaanxi, and Shanxi
4800–4300	Tangjiagang culture	汤家岗文化	Hunan, Liyang Plain of the Lishui River
4700–2900	Hongshan culture	紅山文化	Inner Mongolia, Liaoning, and Hebei
4100–2600	Dawenkou culture	大汶口文化	Shandong, Anhui, Henan, and Jiangsu
3800–3300	Songze culture	崧澤文化	Lake Tai area
3400–2250	Liangzhu culture	良渚文化	Yangtze River Delta
3100–2700	Majiayao culture	馬家窯文化	upper Yellow River region in Gansu and Qinghai
3100–2700	Qujialing culture	屈家嶺文化	middle Yangtze region in Hubei and Hunan
3000–2000	Longshan culture	龍山文化	central and lower Yellow River
2800–2000	Baodun culture	寶墩文化	Chengdu Plain
2500–2000	Shijiahe culture	石家河文化	middle Yangtze region in Hubei
1900–1500	Yueshi culture	岳石文化	lower Yellow River region in Shandong
1600–1400	Erligang culture	二里崗文化	North China Plain

== Schematic outline ==
Map of the Chinese Neolithic

These cultures existed during the period from 8500 to 1500 BC. Neolithic cultures remain unmarked and Bronze Age cultures (from 2000 BC) are marked with *. There are many differences in opinion on the dating for these cultures, so the dates chosen here are tentative:

Year (BC)	North-east China (1)	Upper Yellow River (2)	Middle Yellow River (3)	Lower- Yellow River (4)	Lower- Yangtze (5)	Middle- Yangtze (6)	Sichuan (7)	Southeast China (8)	South-west China (9)
8500			Nanzhuangtou; 8500–7700						
8000			Nanzhuangtou; 8500–7700						
7500									
7000						Pengtoushan (including Chengbeixi and Zaoshi); 7000–5800			
6500		Dadiwan	Peiligang	Houli; 6500–5500		Pengtoushan (including Chengbeixi and Zaoshi); 7000–5800		Zengpiyan; 7000–5500	
	Xinglongwa; 6200–5400	Laoguantai	Cishan	Houli; 6500–5500		Pengtoushan (including Chengbeixi and Zaoshi); 7000–5800		Zengpiyan; 7000–5500	
	Xinglongwa; 6200–5400	Baijia; 6500–5000	Jiahu	Houli; 6500–5500		Pengtoushan (including Chengbeixi and Zaoshi); 7000–5800		Zengpiyan; 7000–5500	
6000	Xinglongwa; 6200–5400	Baijia; 6500–5000	Lijiacun; 6500–5000	Houli; 6500–5500	Kuahuqiao; 6000–5000	Pengtoushan (including Chengbeixi and Zaoshi); 7000–5800		Zengpiyan; 7000–5500	
5500	Xinglongwa; 6200–5400	Baijia; 6500–5000	Lijiacun; 6500–5000	Houli; 6500–5500	Kuahuqiao; 6000–5000				
		Baijia; 6500–5000	Lijiacun; 6500–5000	Beixin; 5300–4500	Kuahuqiao; 6000–5000				
	Xinle; 5300–4800	Baijia; 6500–5000	Lijiacun; 6500–5000	Beixin; 5300–4500	Kuahuqiao; 6000–5000				
5000	Xinle; 5300–4800		Yangshao; 5000–3000	Beixin; 5300–4500	Hemudu; 5000–3400	Daxi; 5000–3300		Dapenkeng	
	Xinle; 5300–4800		Yangshao; 5000–3000	Beixin; 5300–4500	Hemudu; 5000–3400	Daxi; 5000–3300		Fuguodun; 5000–3000	
			Yangshao; 5000–3000	Beixin; 5300–4500	Majiabang; 5000–4000	Daxi; 5000–3300		Fuguodun; 5000–3000	
4500	Zhaobaogou; 4500–4000		Yangshao; 5000–3000		Majiabang; 5000–4000	Daxi; 5000–3300		Fuguodun; 5000–3000	
	Zhaobaogou; 4500–4000		Yangshao; 5000–3000	Dawenkou; 4300–2600	Songze; 4000–3000	Daxi; 5000–3300		Fuguodun; 5000–3000	
4000	Zhaobaogou; 4500–4000		Yangshao; 5000–3000	Dawenkou; 4300–2600	Songze; 4000–3000	Daxi; 5000–3300		Fuguodun; 5000–3000	
3500			Yangshao; 5000–3000	Dawenkou; 4300–2600	Songze; 4000–3000	Qujialing; 3500–2600		Fuguodun; 5000–3000	
	Hongshan (incl. Fuhe); 3400–2300		Yangshao; 5000–3000	Dawenkou; 4300–2600	Songze; 4000–3000	Qujialing; 3500–2600	Yingpanshan; 3100–?	Fuguodun; 5000–3000	
	Hongshan (incl. Fuhe); 3400–2300	Majiayao; 3300–2700	Yangshao; 5000–3000	Dawenkou; 4300–2600	Liangzhu; 3200–1800	Qujialing; 3500–2600	Yingpanshan; 3100–?	Fuguodun; 5000–3000	
3000	Hongshan (incl. Fuhe); 3400–2300	Majiayao; 3300–2700		Dawenkou; 4300–2600	Liangzhu; 3200–1800	Qujialing; 3500–2600		Tanishan	
	Hongshan (incl. Fuhe); 3400–2300	Banshan; 2700–2400		Dawenkou; 4300–2600	Liangzhu; 3200–1800	Shijiahe; 2500–2000	Baodun; 2800–2000	Shixia	
	Hongshan (incl. Fuhe); 3400–2300	Banshan; 2700–2400	Longshan; 2800–2000		Liangzhu; 3200–1800	Shijiahe; 2500–2000	Baodun; 2800–2000	Nianyuzhuan	
2500	Hongshan (incl. Fuhe); 3400–2300	Machang; 2400–2000	Longshan; 2800–2000		Liangzhu; 3200–1800	Qinglongquan	Baodun; 2800–2000	Qinglongquan	
	Hongshan (incl. Fuhe); 3400–2300	Machang; 2400–2000	Longshan; 2800–2000		Liangzhu; 3200–1800	Longshan; 2400–2000	Baodun; 2800–2000	Hedang; 3000–?	Baiyangcun; 2200–2100
	*Xiaoheyan; 3000–2000	*Qijia; 2300–1800	*Shimao; 2300–1800		Liangzhu; 3200–1800	Longshan; 2400–2000	Baodun; 2800–2000	Hedang; 3000–?	Baiyangcun; 2200–2100
2000	*Xiajiadian; 2200–300	*Qijia; 2300–1800	*Shimao; 2300–1800		Liangzhu; 3200–1800	Longshan; 2400–2000	Baodun; 2800–2000	Hedang; 3000–?	Dalongtan; 2100–2000
	*Xiajiadian; 2200–300	*Qijia; 2300–1800	*Erlitou; 1900–1500	*Yueshi; 1900–1500	Liangzhu; 3200–1800	*Panlongcheng; 1900-1400		Hedang; 3000–?	Dalongtan; 2100–2000
	*Xiajiadian; 2200–300	*Siba; 1950–1500	*Erlitou; 1900–1500	*Yueshi; 1900–1500	*Maqiao; 1800–1200	*Panlongcheng; 1900-1400		Hedang; 3000–?	Âu Việt; 2000-257
1500	*Xiajiadian; 2200–300	*Siba; 1950–1500	*Erligang; 1600–1400	*Yueshi; 1900–1500	*Maqiao; 1800–1200	*Panlongcheng; 1900-1400	*Sanxingdui; 1700–1150	*Wucheng; 1600-1200	Âu Việt; 2000-257
	*Xiajiadian; 2200–300		*Erligang; 1600–1400		*Maqiao; 1800–1200	*Wucheng; 1400-1200	*Sanxingdui; 1700–1150	*Wucheng; 1600-1200	Âu Việt; 2000-257
	*Xiajiadian; 2200–300	*Siwa; 1350-650	*Huanbei; 1350-1300			*Wucheng; 1400-1200	*Shi'erqiao; 1200-800	*Wucheng; 1600-1200	Âu Việt; 2000-257
1000	*Xiajiadian; 2200–300	*Siwa; 1350-650	*Zhou dynasty 1046–256			*Dayangzhou; 1200-?	*Shi'erqiao; 1200-800	*Dayangzhou; 1200-?	Âu Việt; 2000-257
	*Xiajiadian; 2200–300	*Ordos; 800-150	*Zhou dynasty 1046–256			*Dayangzhou; 1200-?	*Shi'erqiao; 1200-800	*Dayangzhou; 1200-?	Âu Việt; 2000-257
	*Xiajiadian; 2200–300	*Ordos; 800-150	*Zhou dynasty 1046–256				*Jinsha; 800-200		Âu Việt; 2000-257

For this schematic outline of its neolithic cultures China has been divided into the following nine parts:

1. Northeast China: Inner Mongolia, Heilongjiang, Jilin and Liaoning.
2. Northwest China (Upper Yellow River): Gansu, Qinghai and western part of Shaanxi.
3. North-central China (Middle Yellow River): Shanxi, Hebei, western part of Henan and eastern part of Shaanxi.
4. Eastern China (lower Yellow River): Shandong, Anhui, northern part of Jiangsu and eastern part Henan.
5. East-south-eastern China (lower Yangtze): Zhejiang and biggest part of Jiangsu.
6. South-central China (middle Yangtze): Hubei and northern part of Hunan.
7. Sichuan and upper Yangtze.
8. Southeast China: Fujian, Jiangxi, Guangdong, Guangxi, southern part of Hunan, lower Red River in the northern part of Vietnam and the island of Taiwan.
9. Southwest China: Yunnan and Guizhou.

== See also ==
- History of China
- List of Bronze Age sites in China
- List of Palaeolithic sites in China
- List of inventions and discoveries of Neolithic China
- Neolithic signs in China
- Prehistory of China
- Prehistoric Beifudi site
- Three Sovereigns and Five Emperors
- Xia dynasty
