= Shar Mörön =

Shar Mörön (Mongolian: Шар Мөрөн, lit. 'Yellow River') can refer to the following rivers in China:

- Shar Mörön, one of the headwaters of the Xiliao River, which in turn is one of the headwaters of the Liao River in Manchuria.
- The Yellow River.
