= Xinle =

Xinle may refer to:

- Xinle culture (5500-4800 BC), Neolithic culture in northeast China, found primarily around the lower Liao River on the Liaodong Peninsula in Liaoning
- Xinle, Hebei, a city in Shijiazhuang, Hebei, China
- Xinle, Sichuan, a town in Luzhou, Sichuan, China
- Xinle Township, Heilongjiang, a township in Hulin, Heilongjiang, China
- Xinle Township, Chongqing, a township in Shizhu Tujia Autonomous County, Chongqing, China
- Xinle Subdistrict, Shenyang, a subdistrict in Huanggu District, Shenyang, Liaoning, China
- Xinle Subdistrict, Harbin, a subdistrict in Daowai District, Harbin, Heilongjiang, China
