= Niuheliang =

Archaeological site in China

Coordinates: 41.322015°N 119.513190°E

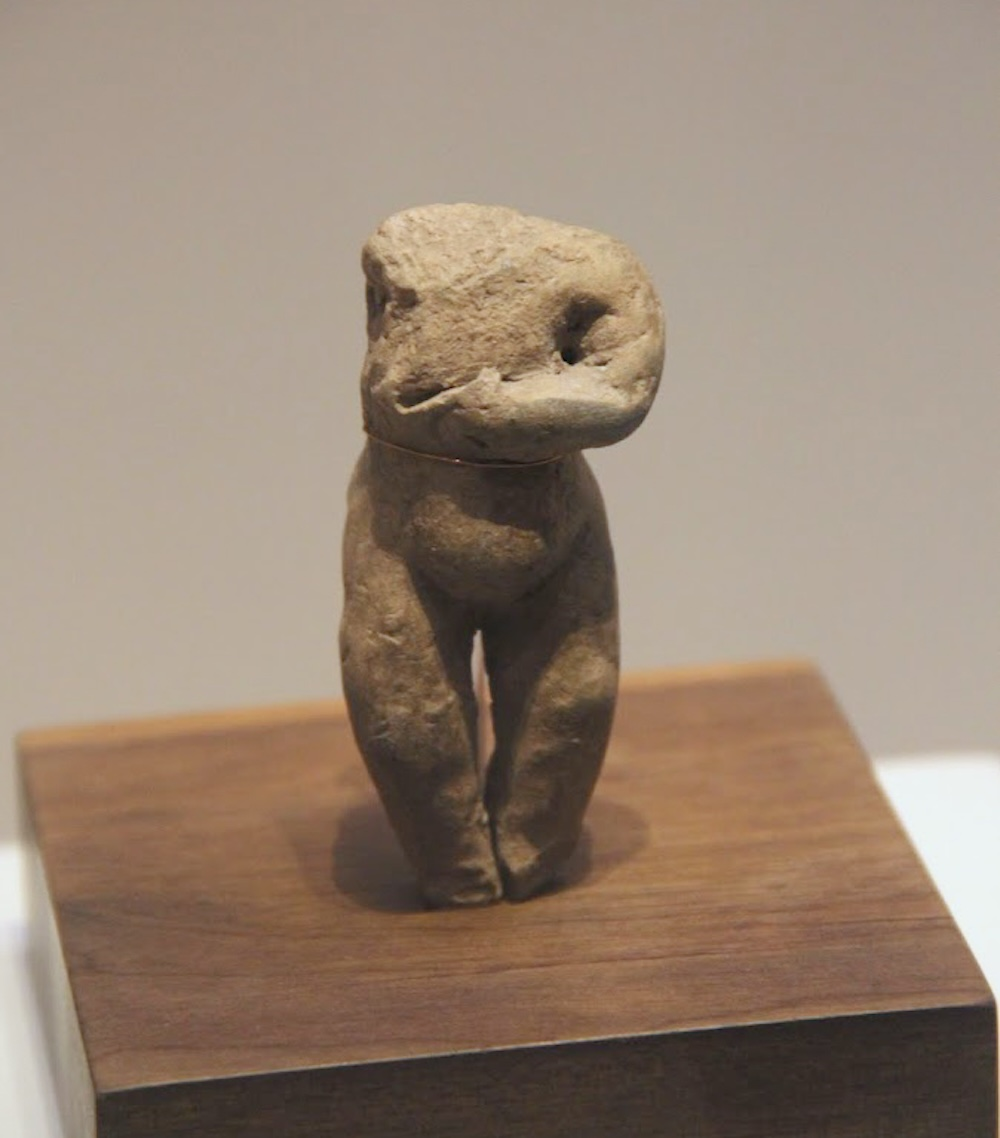
Female torso, 3500 BC, Hongshan Culture, Liaoning, 1982. Height 7.8 cm. Red brown terracotta. National Museum of China

Niuheliang (Chinese: 牛河梁) is a Neolithic archaeological site in Liaoning Province, Northeast China, along the middle and upper reaches of the Laoha River and the Yingjin River (presently on the border of Chaoyang and Jianping County). Discovered in 1983, the Niuheliang site belongs to the Hongshan culture (4700–2900 BC). It includes evidence of religion, such as a temple, an altar and a cairn.

== Description ==
Niuheliang is a large burial site scattered over hill tops over a 50 square kilometer area. The altitude of Niuheliang ranges between 550 meters and 680 meters above sea level.

Niuheliang dates to 3,500–3,000 BCE. It was a burial and sacrificial center in the late Hongshan period. No residential settlements have been discovered here so far.

== Temple ==
The site features a unique temple on a loam platform, with an altar and cairn complex, covering an area of around 5 km^{2}. The altar at Niuheliang was made of stone platforms, supported by painted, clay cylinders. A north–south axis connects this temple complex with a central peak of the Zhushan (猪山) mountains, otherwise known as "Pig Mountain". The subterranean ritual complex was built on a ridge and decorated with painted walls, referred to by Chinese archaeologists as the Goddess Temple, due to the discovery of a clay female head with jade inlaid eyes.

Pig dragons and large, nude, clay figurines were also found at Niuheliang. Some of the figurines are up to three times the size of real-life humans; the interior of the figurines was structured from wood and straw.

Six groups of cairns were discovered nearby, south and west of the temple site. The primary burial goods accompanying the graves were jade artifacts, although most of the excavated graves had already been looted.

=== Interpretation ===
According to archaeologist Guo Dashun, who was in charge of excavating this site, there are in fact two varieties of animals represented in the jades. One is a boar with narrow eyes and flat snout; the other is a bear, represented by round eyes and short perky ears. He also found similar boar and bear symbolism in the vessels found at Xiaoheyan site.

The bear has been widely worshipped in Northeast Asia, such as by the Ainu in northern Japan, and in Siberia. Thus, Guo Dashun sees this site in the wider Northeast Asian context.

Some similarities with Xinglongwa culture (6200–5400 BC) of northeastern China have also been pointed out.

== Pyramidal structure ==
One year after the temple-cairns complex was discovered nearby a pyramidal structure "disguised" as a hill known as Zhuanshanzi (轉山子), which was included during the Han dynasty (−206~220) in a section of the Great Wall. Built with earth and imported stone, its structure is more elaborate than the cairns.

This site contains some of the essential elements, temples, cairns and platforms, present in later ancestor worship of the Chinese such as the Ming tombs 5000 years later.
