= Guo Dashun =

Chinese archaeologist

- 郭大顺
- Born: November 1938 (age 87); Zhangjiakou, Hebei, China
- Education: Peking University
- Known for: Discovery and excavation of the Niuheliang site; theories on the Hongshan culture and the origin of the Chinese dragon
- Scientific career
- Fields: Archaeology
- Workplaces: Liaoning Provincial Institute of Cultural Relics and Archaeology; * China Archaeology Research Center, Peking University

Guo Dashun (Chinese: 郭大顺; pinyin: Guō Dàshùn; born November 1938) is a Chinese archaeologist known for his research on the Hongshan culture (c. 4700–2900 BCE) of Northeast China. As director of the first large‑scale excavations at Niuheliang, he revealed a ritual landscape, including the so‑called “Goddess Temple,” stone altars, and cairn burials, that reshaped understanding of early Chinese civilisation. Guo’s subsequent theories on animal totems, the origin of the Chinese dragon, and the independent development of a “Liaohe civilisation” challenged the once‑dominant Central Plains paradigm and helped establish the multi‑regional (多元一体) model of Chinese origins.

== Early life and education ==
Guo was born in Zhangjiakou, Hebei Province, in November 1938. He earned both his BA (1962) and MA (1965) in archaeology at Peking University, studying under Professor Su Bingqi.

== Career ==
In 1968 Guo was assigned to the Liaoning Provincial Museum (later the Liaoning Provincial Institute of Cultural Relics and Archaeology). He served as Vice‑Director of the Liaoning Provincial Cultural Department (1983–1994) and Director of the Institute until 1998, after which he was named Honorary Director. He is an Executive Director of the Archaeology Society of China and a professor at Peking University’s China Archaeology Research Center.

== Major excavations ==
=== Niuheliang ===
Between 1983 and 1985 Guo led the discovery and excavation of Niuheliang, a 50 km^{2} hill‑top ceremonial complex in western Liaoning. Finds included a loam‑built “Goddess Temple” lined with painted walls, a north–south ritual axis, jade “pig‑dragons,” and life‑size clay figurines with jade‑inlaid eyes. Guo interpreted the triadic layout of altar, temple and cairns as evidence of an early theocratic chiefdom or “proto‑state.”

=== Other Hongshan sites ===
Guo also directed excavations at Xiaoheyan, Dongshanzui, Shipengshan and the pyramidal earthen platform of Zhuanshanzi, all of which reinforced the picture of a complex, ritual‑focused Hongshan society.

== Theories and interpretations ==
=== Hongshan ritual society ===
Guo argued that the richness of jade grave goods and the separation of ceremonial and residential zones show that Hongshan society had moved beyond simple tribal organisation to a stratified chiefdom.

=== Symbolic motifs: dragon, bear and boar ===
Analysing animal imagery, Guo identified two principal zoomorphic types in Hongshan jades—boar (narrow eyes, flat snout) and bear (round eyes, perked ears)—which he linked to a totemic belief system also visible on Xiaoheyan pottery. Tracing a continuous sequence from Chahai to Hongshan, he proposed that the Chinese dragon ultimately derived from these motifs.

=== Liaohe Basin as an independent civilisation centre ===
In 1981 Guo and Sun Shoudao advanced the thesis that the West Liao River basin constituted an independent cradle of Chinese civilisation contemporaneous with the Yellow River heartland, pushing China’s civilisational timeline back to c. 5000 BP. Subsequent Hongshan discoveries and China’s national “Project to Trace the Origins of Chinese Civilisation” (2018) lent wide support to this view.

=== Multiple cradles model ===
Building on the theories by Su Bingqi, Guo promoted a multi‑regional model in which Hongshan (north), Liangzhu (south‑east) and other cultures each reached an “ancient‑state” level before converging into a unified Chinese civilisation. He likened the convergence to the joining of dragons and flowers (found in Yangshao painted pottery) in Chinese mythology.

== Influence and legacy ==
Guo’s work shifted scholarly consensus away from a Central‑Plains‑centric narrative and highlighted the ceremonial and symbolic dimensions of Neolithic China. Dubbed the “No. 1 person of Hongshan culture” (红山文化第一人), he is credited with demonstrating that regions north of the Great Wall played a role in the formation of Chinese civilisation.

== International collaborations ==
Guo co‑authored the first English‑language study of Niuheliang with British archaeologist Gina L. Barnes in 1996, contributed to the volume The Archaeology of Northeast China: Beyond the Great Wall in 1995, and lectured widely abroad, including at University College London in 2012.

== Post‑retirement ==
Since retiring in 1998, Professor Guo Dashun has remained deeply engaged in Hongshan archaeology. He continues to advise ongoing excavations and research projects, led the push to nominate the Niuheliang site for UNESCO World Heritage inscription, serves as an academic consultant on major museum exhibitions, and appears regularly in documentary features. In 2024 he delivered the keynote lecture at the 70th‑anniversary Hongshan symposium, outlining a three‑stage schema of Chinese civilisation (Ancient Kingdom → Regional State → Empire).

== Selected publications ==
- Sun Shoudao & Guo Dashun (1984). “论辽河流域的原始文明与龙的起源” [On the Primitive Civilisation of the Liaohe River Basin and the Origin of the Dragon]. Wenwu 6: 11–17.
- Guo Dashun (1995). “Hongshan and Related Cultures.” In: S. M. Nelson (ed.), The Archaeology of Northeast China: Beyond the Great Wall, pp. 21–64.
- Barnes, G. L.; Guo Dashun (1996). “The Ritual Landscape of ‘Boar Mountain’ Basin: The Niuheliang Site Complex of North‑Eastern China.” World Archaeology 28 (2): 209–219. doi:10.1080/00438243.1996.9980341.
