= Hongshan culture =

Neolithic culture in northeast China

- The Hongshan culture and other contemporary cultures c. 3000 BC
- Period: Neolithic
- Dates: c. 4700 to 2900 BC
- Preceded by: Xinglongwa culture, Xinle culture, Zhaobaogou culture
- Followed by: Xiaoheyan (3000-2000 BCE); Lower Xiajiadian culture (2200-1600 BCE); Upper Xiajiadian culture (1000-600 BCE)

The Hongshan culture (simplified Chinese: 红山文化; traditional Chinese: 紅山文化; pinyin: Hóngshān wénhuà) was a Neolithic culture in the West Liao river basin in northeast China. Hongshan sites have been found in an area stretching from Inner Mongolia to Liaoning, and dated from about 4700 to 2900 BC.

The culture is named after Hongshanhou (simplified Chinese: 红山后; traditional Chinese: 紅山後; pinyin: Hóngshān hòu), a site in Hongshan District, Chifeng. The Hongshanhou site was discovered by the Japanese archaeologist Torii Ryūzō in 1908 and extensively excavated in 1935 by Kōsaku Hamada and Mizuno Seiichi.

== Historical context ==
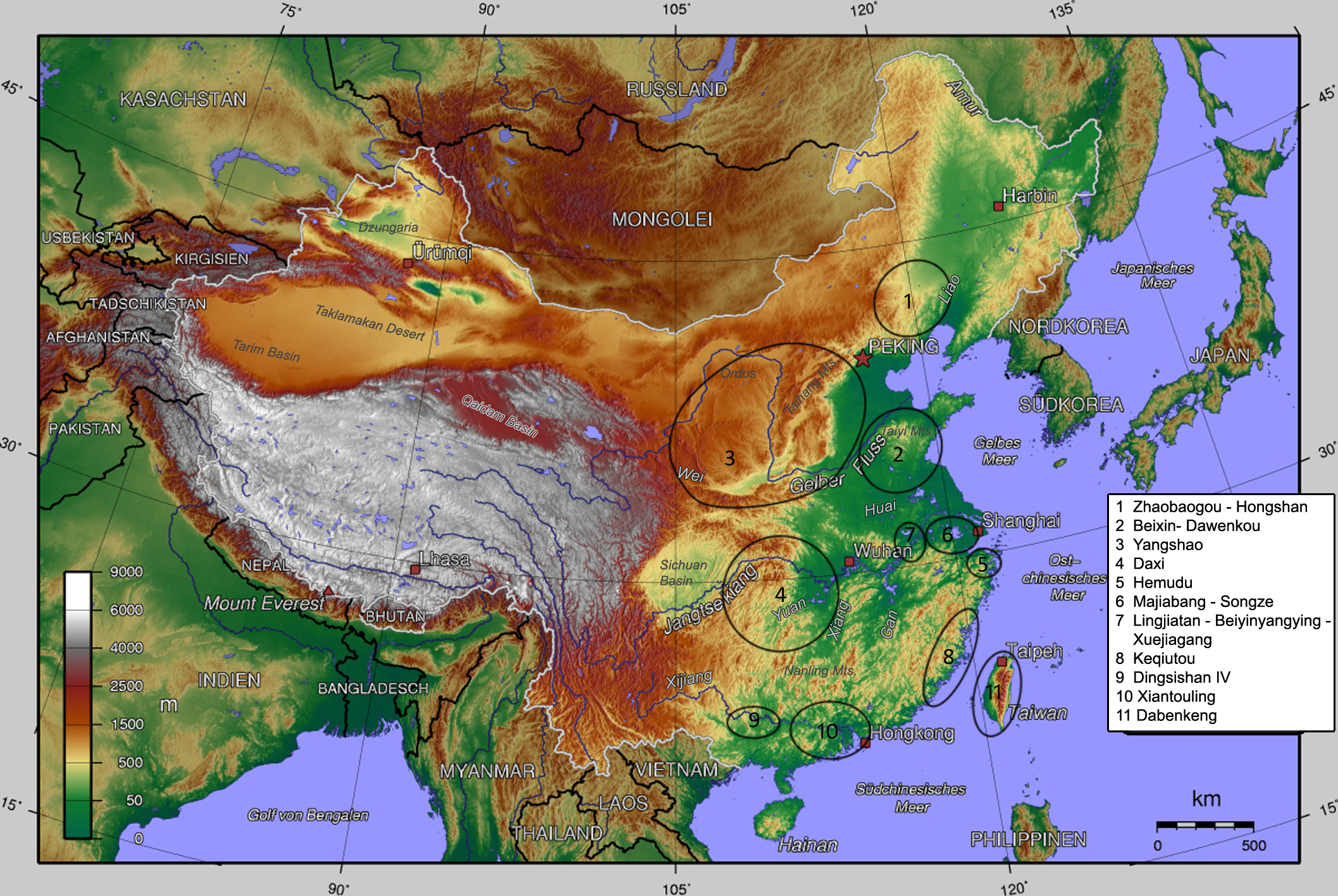
Map of the middle Neolithic cultures in China. Hongshan culture is #1 on the map.

In northeast China, Hongshan culture was preceded by Xinglongwa culture (6200–5400 BC), Xinle culture (5300–4800 BC), and Zhaobaogou culture, which may be contemporary with Xinle and a little later.

The Yangshao culture of the Yellow River existed contemporaneously with the Hongshan culture (see map). These two cultures interacted with each other.

Hongshan culture was succeeded by the Lower Xiajiadian culture (2200–1600 BC), which was replaced by a different Upper Xiajiadian culture (1000-600 BC) with a shift from farming to pastoral nomadism, likely due to climate change. In the historical period, the West Liao basin was mainly populated by nomads.

== Genetics and linguistic identity ==
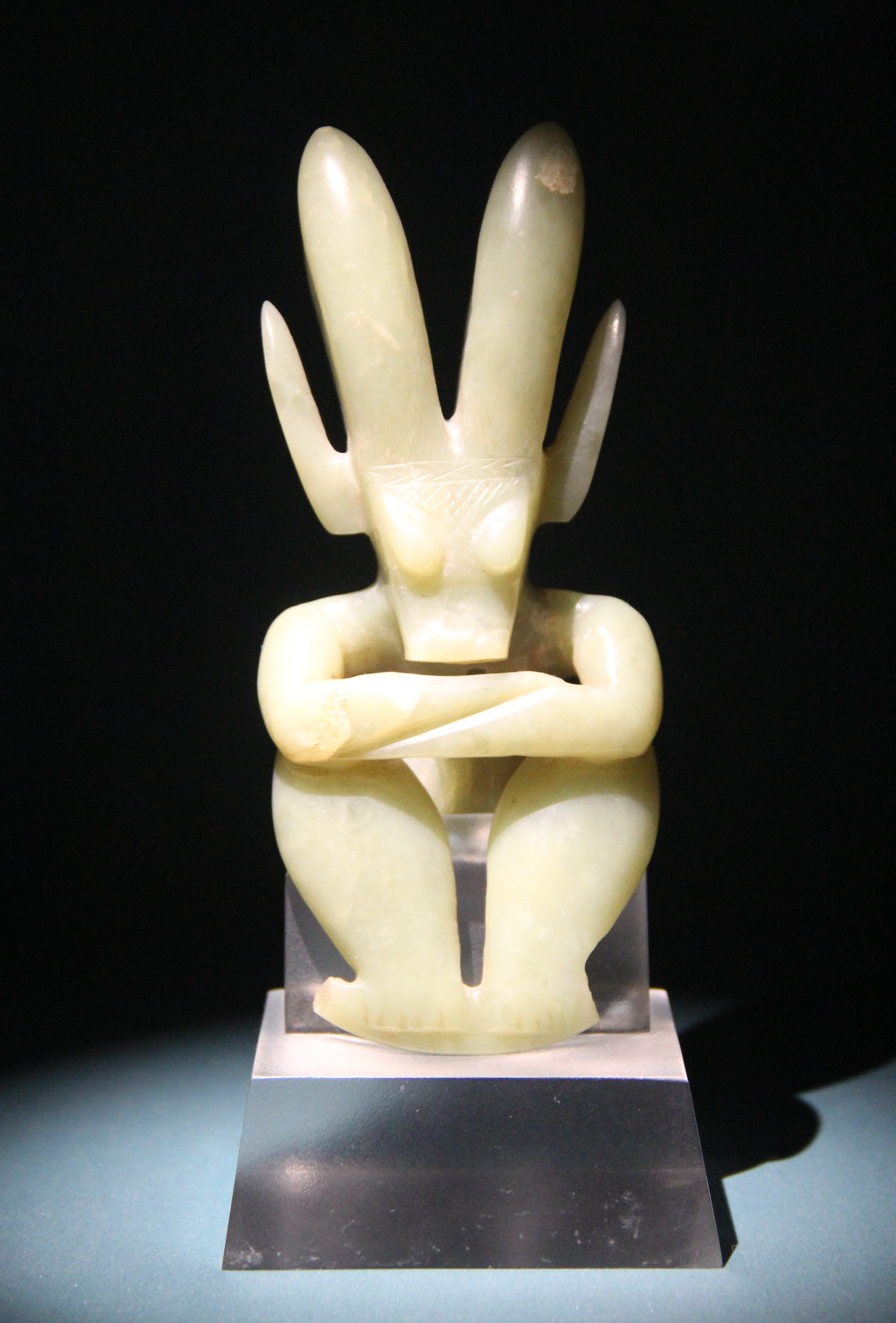
Jade humanoid, Hongshan Culture.

A genetic study by Yinqiu Cui et al. from 2013 analyzed the Y-chromosome DNA haplogroup based N subclade; it found that DNA samples from 63% of the combined samples from various Hongshan archaeological sites belonged to the subclade N1 (xN1a, N1c) of the paternal haplogroup N-M231 and calculated N to have been the predominant haplogroup in the region in the Neolithic period at 89%, with its share gradually declining over time. Today, this haplogroup is found in northern Han, Mongols, Manchu, Oroqen, Xibe and Hezhe at low frequencies. Other paternal haplogroups identified in the study were C and O3a (O3a3), both of which predominate among the present-day inhabitants of the region.

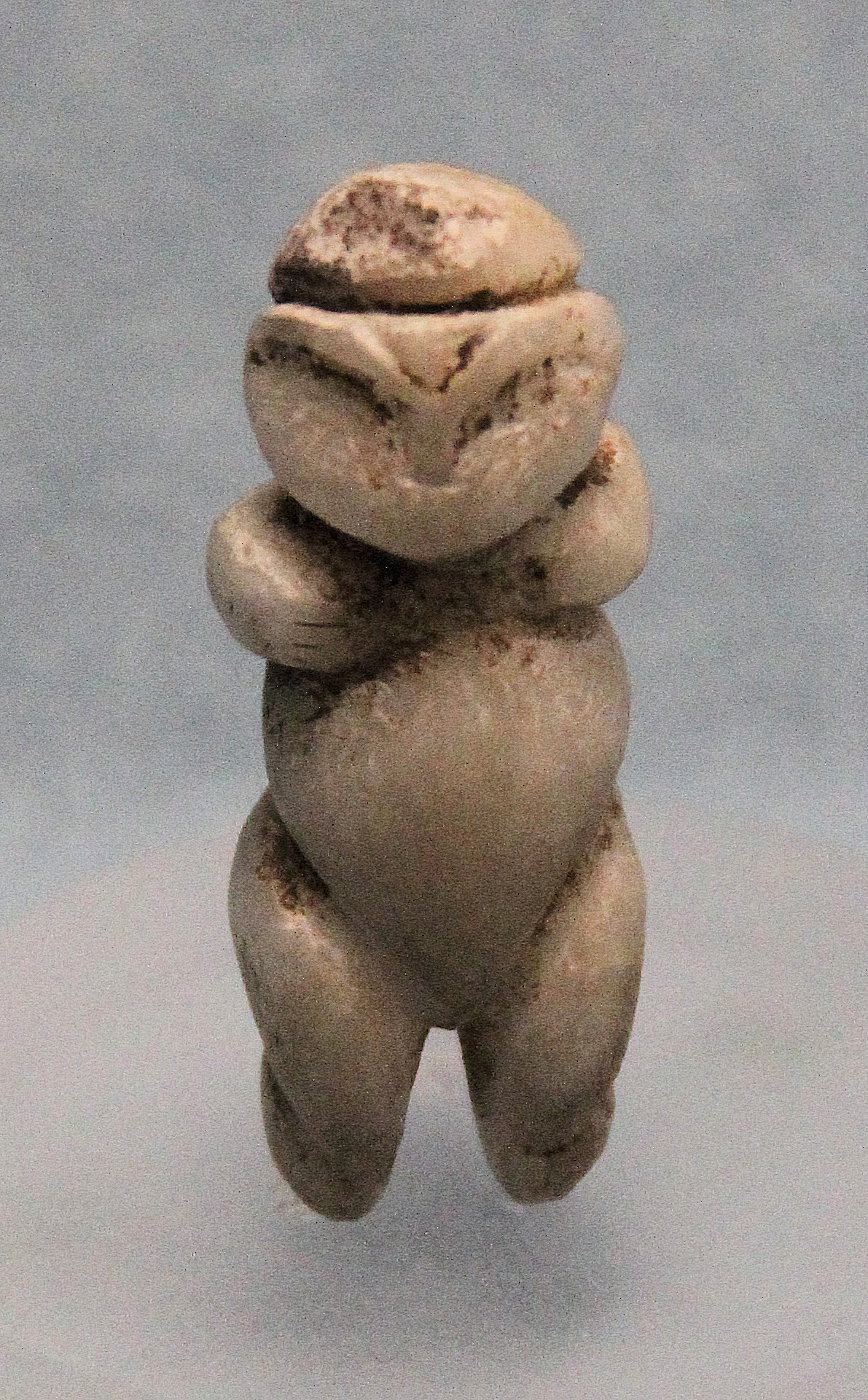
Hongshan human figurine (jade)

Nelson et al. 2020 attempts to link the Hongshan culture to a "Transeurasian" (Altaic) linguistic context. According to a study on genetic distance measurements from a large scale genetic study from 2021 titled 'Genomic insights into the formation of human populations in East Asia', hunter-gatherers of Mongolia and the Amur River Basin have ancestry shared by Mongolic and Tungusic language speakers, but they did not carry West Liao River farmer ancestry, contradicting the Transeurasian hypothesis proposed by Martine Robbeets et al. that the expansion of West Liao River farmers spread these proto-languages.

A 2020 study discovered substantial genetic changes in the West Liao River region over time. An increase in the reliance on millet farming between the Middle-to-Late Neolithic is associated with higher genetic affinity to the Yellow River basin (generally associated with speakers of the Sino-Tibetan languages), while a partial switch to pastoralism in the Bronze Age Upper Xiajiadian culture is associated with a decrease in this genetic affinity. After the Late Neolithic, there was a sharp transition from Yellow River to Amur River-related genetic profiles (generally associated with speakers of Tungusic languages) around the West Liao River. This increase in Amur River affinity corresponds with the transition to a pastoral economy during the Bronze Age.

A 2021 study found that Yellow River millet farmers from the modern-day provinces of Henan and Shandong had played an important role in the formation of Hongshan people or their descendants via both inland and coastal northward migration routes.

A 2025 study found that Hongshan populations inherited genetic contributions from three main sources: Ancient Northeast Asians (ANA), Neolithic Yellow River farmers (NYR), and Shandong hunter-gatherers (Shandong_HG). The ANA-related ancestry likely came from the earlier local Zhaobaogou culture, while the NYR-related ancestry was associated with the Yangshao culture and may have been introduced indirectly by Middle Neolithic farmers from the Dawenkou culture migrating northward from Shandong. These Dawenkou-related farmers carried about 40% ancestry from an early Neolithic Shandong hunter-gatherer lineage and about 60% from a Yangshao-related lineage. Thus, the study’s authors argue that Hongshan populations should be modeled as a mixture of Dawenkou-related and ANA-related ancestries.

== Agriculture ==
Similarly to the Yangshao culture, the Hongshan culture cultivated millet (in particular broomcorn millet). Isotope analyses revealed that millet contributed up to 70% of the human diet in the Early Hongshan and up to 80% in the Late Hongshan.

Around Middle Hongshan, stone harvesting knives, which originate in Yangshao culture, appear in sites such as Haminmangha (哈民忙哈 3600–3300 BCE), showing cultural influence from the Yellow River basin.

== Artifacts ==
The Hongshan culture is known for its carved jade. Hongshan burial artifacts include some of the earliest known examples of jade working. The Hongshan culture is known for its jade pig dragons and embryo dragons. Clay figurines, including figurines of pregnant women, are also found throughout Hongshan sites. Small copper rings were also excavated.

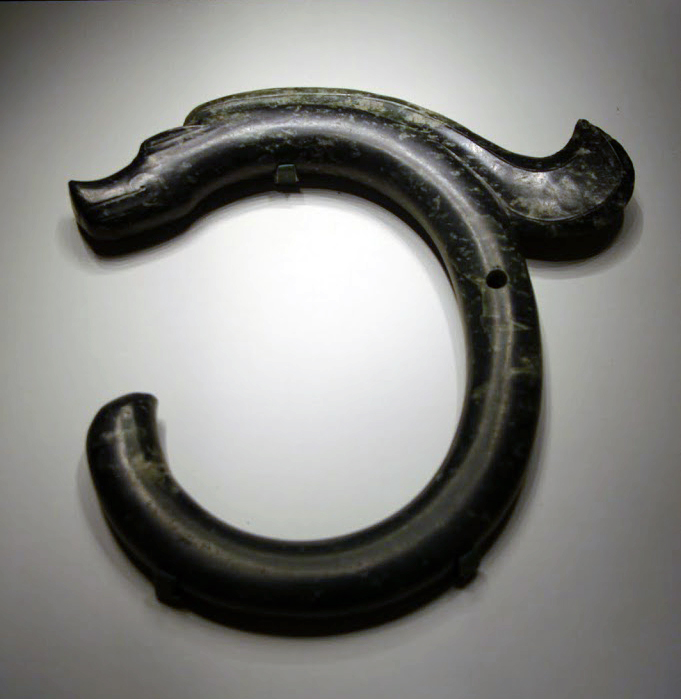
The C-shaped jade dragon of Hongshan Culture

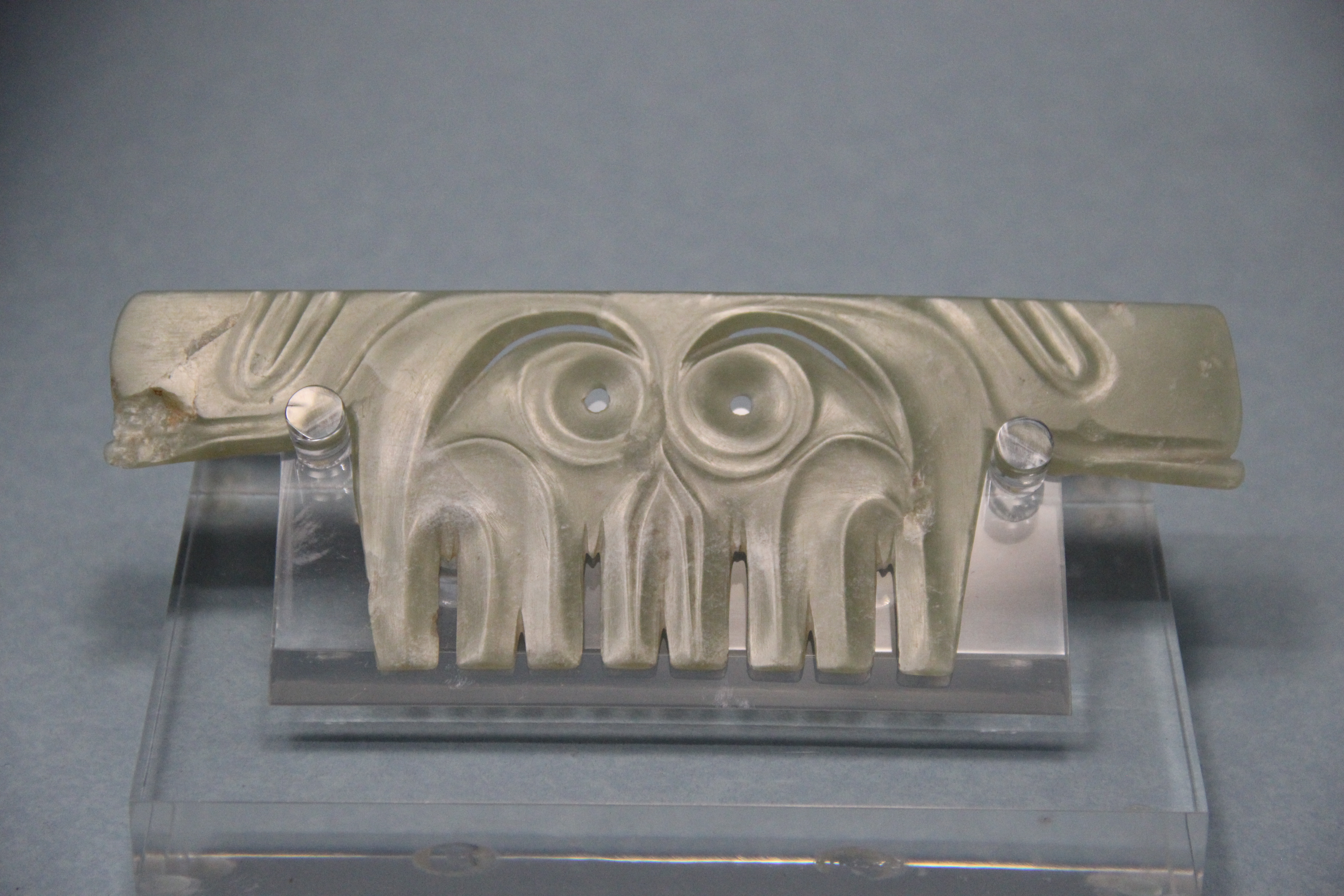
Jade Ornament

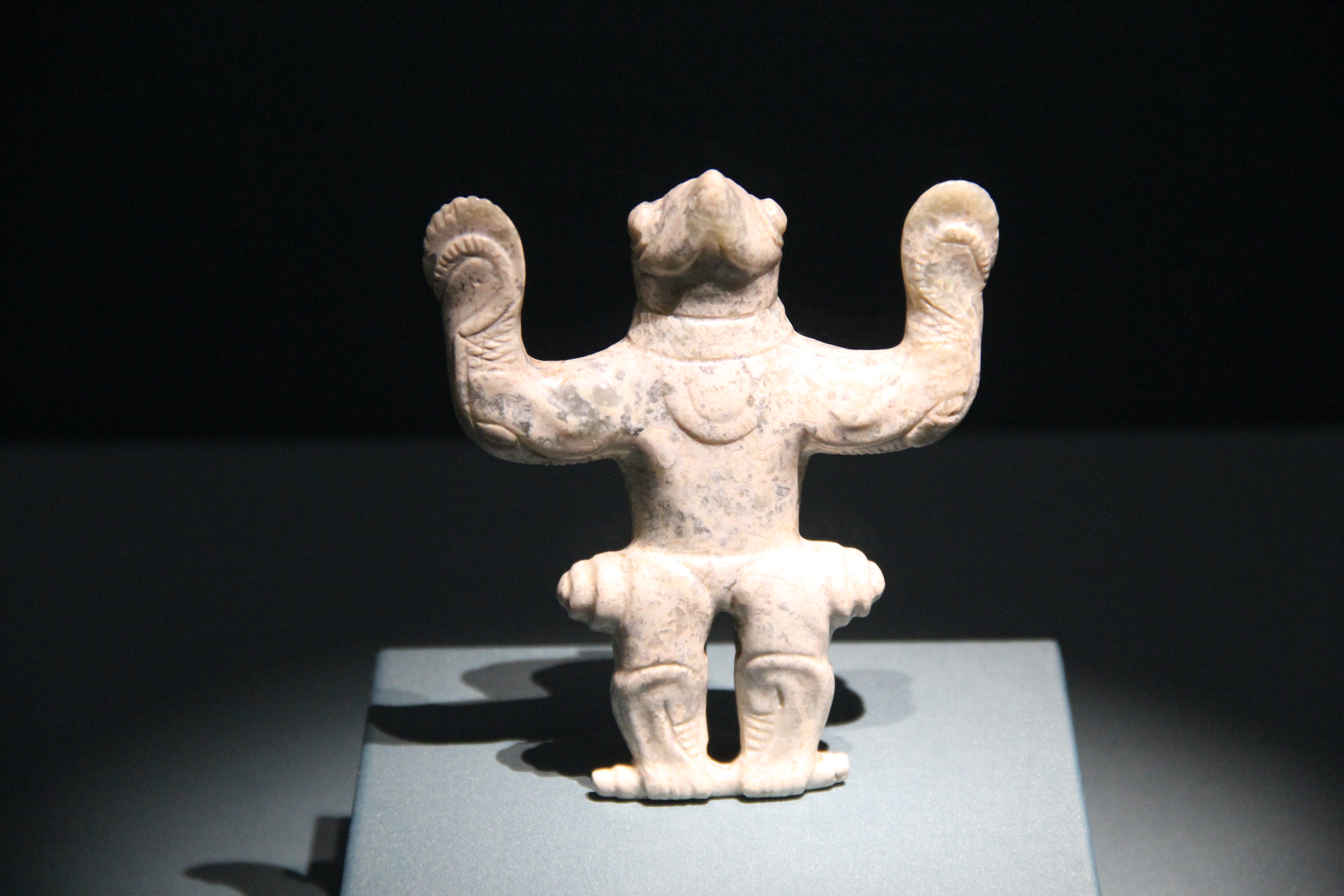
Jade Beast

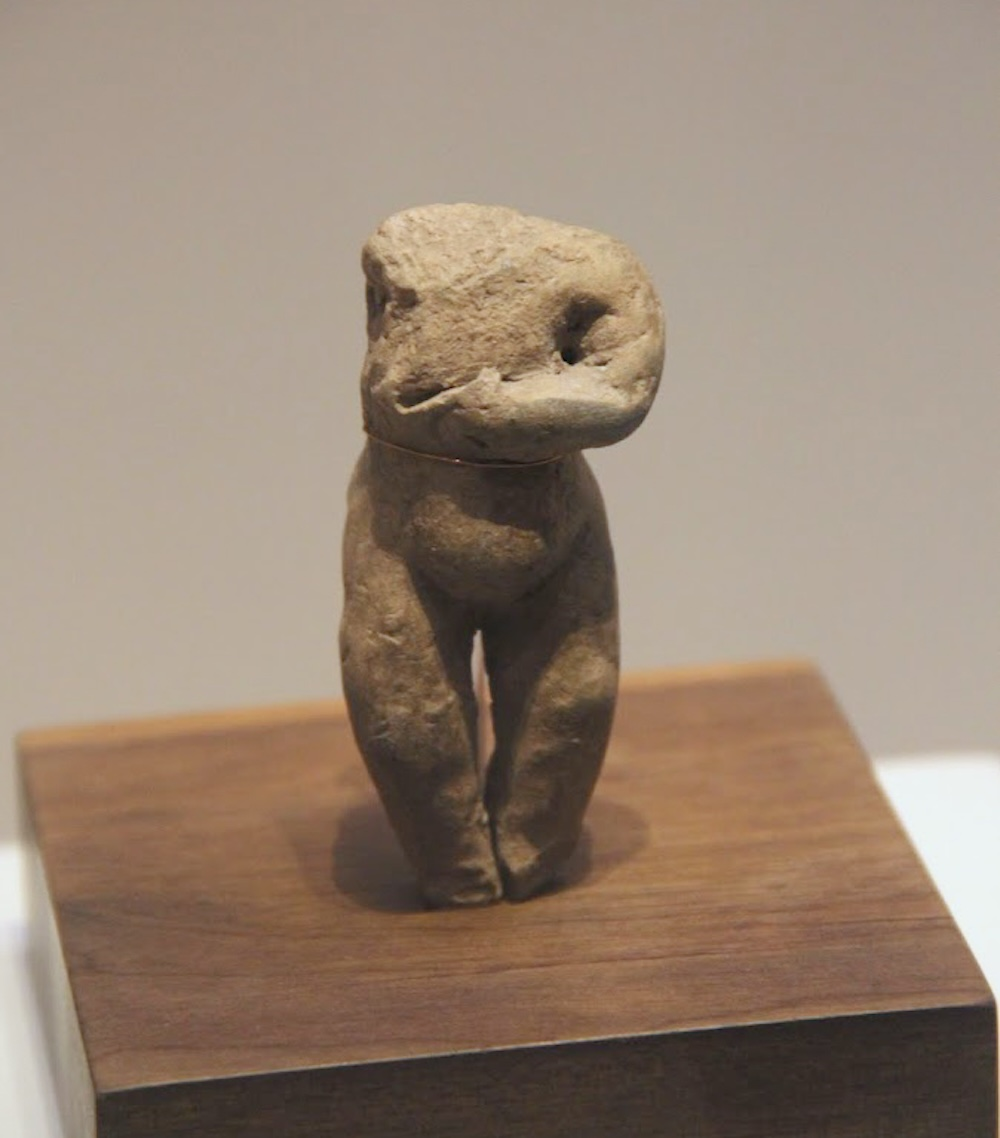
Pottery pregnant woman, Hongshan Culture, Liaoning

== Religion ==
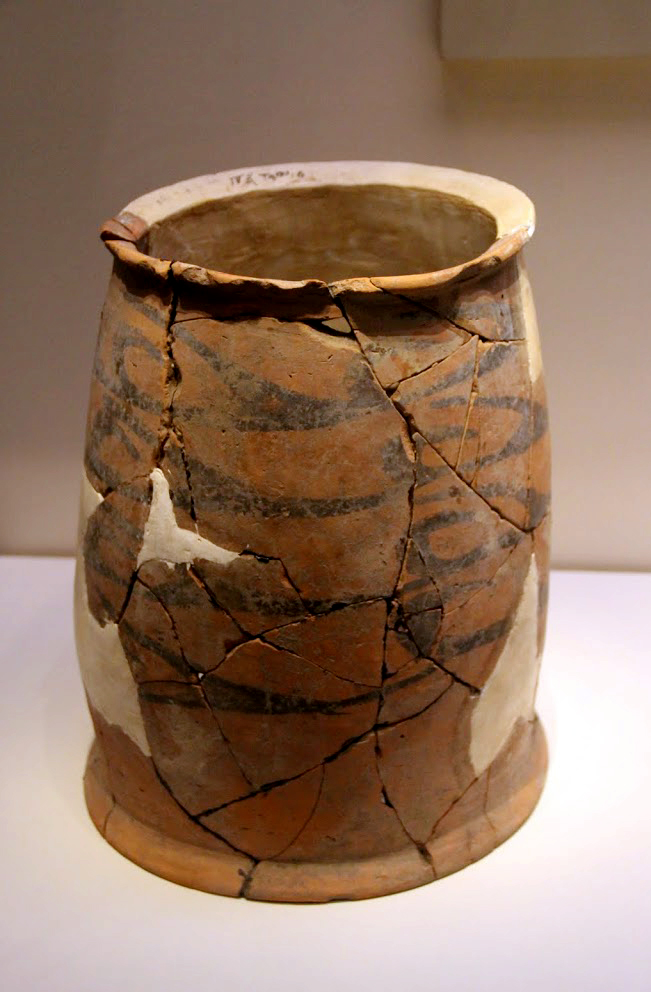
Painted Cylindrical Pottery Vessel, Hongshan Culture (c. 4700–2900 BC), Liaoning, 1988. National Museum of China, Beijing

The archaeological site at Niuheliang is a unique ritual complex associated with the Hongshan culture.

Excavators have discovered an underground temple complex—which included an altar—and also cairns in Niuheliang. The temple was constructed of stone platforms, with painted walls. Archaeologists have given it the name "Goddess Temple" (Chinese: 女神庙; pinyin: nüshenmiao) due to the discovery of a clay female head with jade inlaid eyes. It was an underground structure, 1m deep. Included on its walls are mural paintings. Housed inside the Goddess Temple are clay figurines as large as three times the size of real-life humans. The exceedingly large figurines are possibly deities, but for a religion not reflective in any other Chinese culture.

The existence of complex trading networks and monumental architecture (such as pyramids and the Goddess Temple) point to the existence of a "chiefdom" in these prehistoric communities.

Painted pottery was also discovered within the temple. Over 60 nearby tombs have been unearthed, all constructed of stone and covered by stone mounds, frequently including jade artifacts.

Cairns were discovered atop two nearby hills, with either round or square stepped tombs, made of piled limestone. Entombed inside were sculptures of dragons and tortoises.

It has been suggested that religious sacrifice might have been performed within the Hongshan culture.

== Feng shui ==
Just as suggested by evidence found at early Yangshao culture sites, Hongshan culture sites also provide the earliest evidence for feng shui. The presence of both round and square shapes at Hongshan culture ceremonial centres suggests an early presence of the gaitian cosmography ("round heaven, square earth").

Early feng shui relied on astronomy to find correlations between humans and the universe.

== Development of Chinese civilization ==
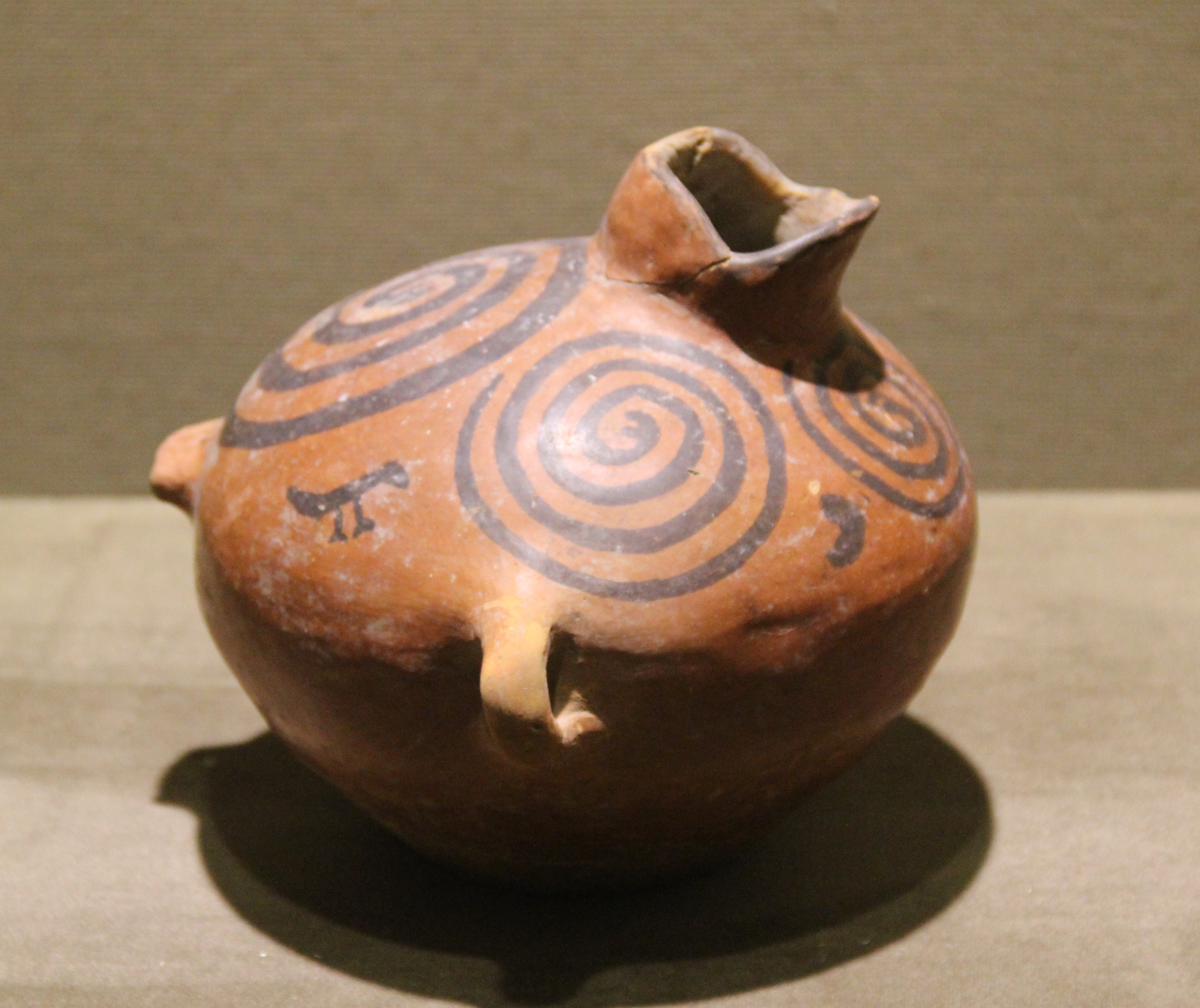
Hongshan Culture painted pottery. Inner Mongolia Museum

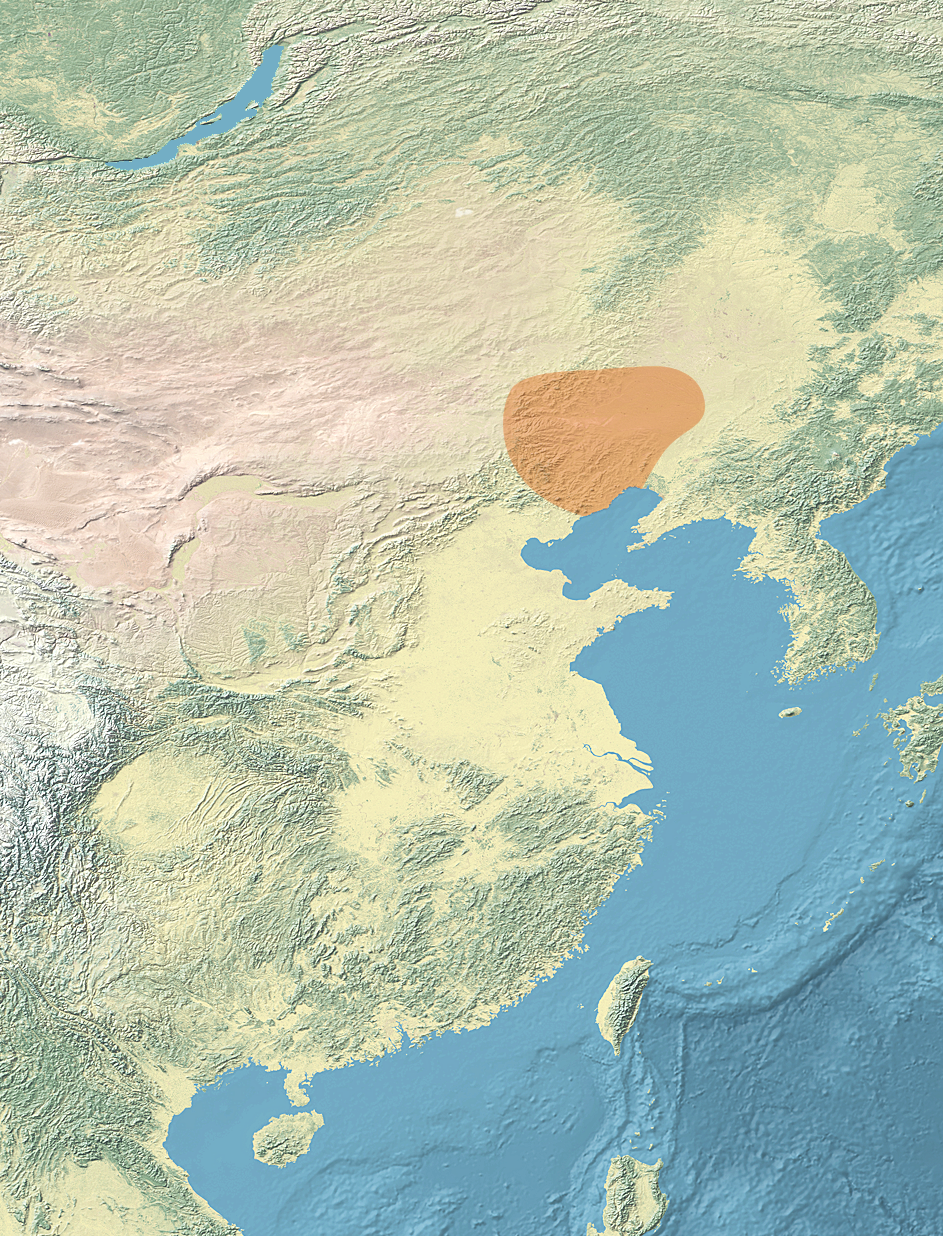
Hongshan culture area.

The Hongshan culture region was thought to have been desert for the past 1 million years. However, a 2015 study found that the region once featured rich aquatic resources and deep lakes and forests that existed from 12,000 years ago to 4,000 years ago. It was changed into desert by climate change which began approximately 4,200 years ago. Therefore, some of the people of the Hongshan culture may have emigrated south to the Yellow River valley approximately 4,000 years ago. Archaeological evidence discovered at the Miaozigou site in Ulanqab, Inner Mongolia, a northern branch of the Yangshao culture from the Yellow River (the Yangshao culture is speculated to be the origin of the Sino-Tibetan languages) demonstrates similarities in the material cultures between the Yellow River and Liao River cultures. Three individuals from the Miaozigou site belonged to haplogroup N1(xN1a, N1c), while the main lineage of Yellow River valley cultures is O2-M122. The existence of N1(xN1a, N1c) among the Miaozigou individuals could serve as evidence for the migration of some of the Hongshan people.

Some Chinese archaeologists such as Guo Dashun see the Hongshan culture as an important stage of early Chinese civilization. Whatever the linguistic affinity of the ancient denizens, Hongshan culture is believed to have exerted an influence on the development of early Chinese civilization. Guo believes that Hongshan had a mature system of ancestral worship, which remained important in throughout all of Chinese history.

According to Sarah M. Nelson, Neolithic Northeast China developed an indigenous agricultural society, which planted millet, buckwheat, echinochloa, and rice. While influenced by ideas beyond the region, "it is doubtful, however, that large-scale migrations of nomadic horse-riders can account for the archaeological sites." There is considerable kinship between jades of Hongshan and some of the jade artifacts from the Shang dynasty, while jars from the succeeding Lower Xiajiadian culture can also be found in later Shang designs of bronze vessels. The ceremonial structures of Hongshan could also possibly influenced the later heaven and earth altars of Chinese emperors from Imperial China. The culture may have also contributed to the development of settlements in ancient Korea.

== See also ==
- List of Neolithic cultures of China
- Xinglonggou
