= Kuahuqiao site =

Archaeological site in Hangzhou, China

Kuahuqiao
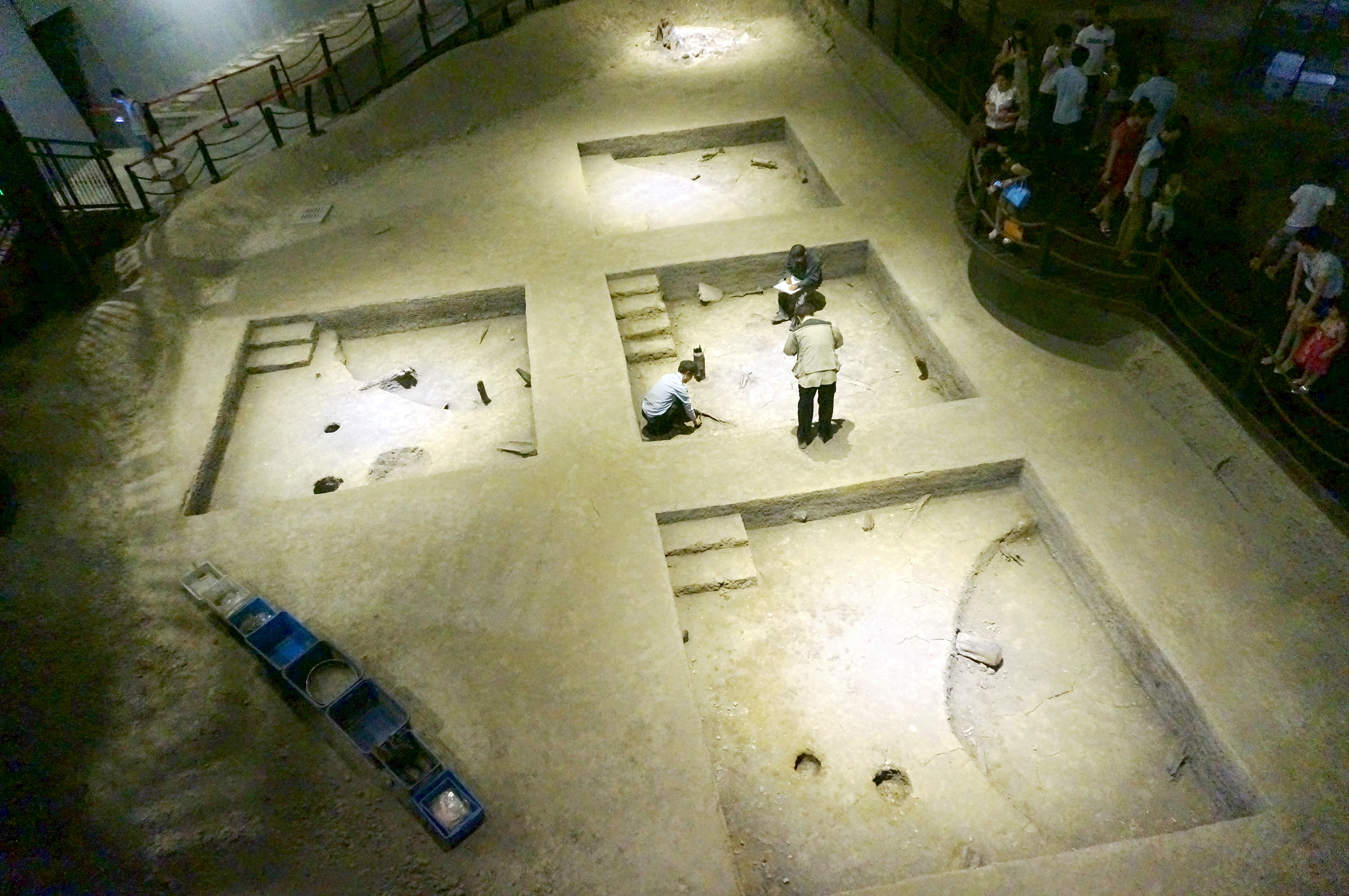
- Interactive map of Kuahuqiao
- 30°08′39″N 120°13′06″E
- Type: Settlement
- Location: Hangzhou, Zhejiang, China

History
- Built: c. 6000 BC

The Kuahuqiao site (Chinese: 跨湖桥遗址; pinyin: Kuahuqiao yizhi) is an early Neolithic site of Kuahuqiao culture (跨湖桥文化 Kuahuqiao Wenhua) near Xianghu village, Xiaoshan District, in suburban Hangzhou, Zhejiang, China. It was first discovered in the early 1970s during the construction of a local brick factory, which destroyed a large part of the site, though professional excavations first started in 1990.

The site is located near the place where the Qiantang River flows into Hangzhou Bay, and it has a history of 8,000 years. Rising sea levels may have suddenly deluged the area around 7,550 years ago.

== Excavations ==
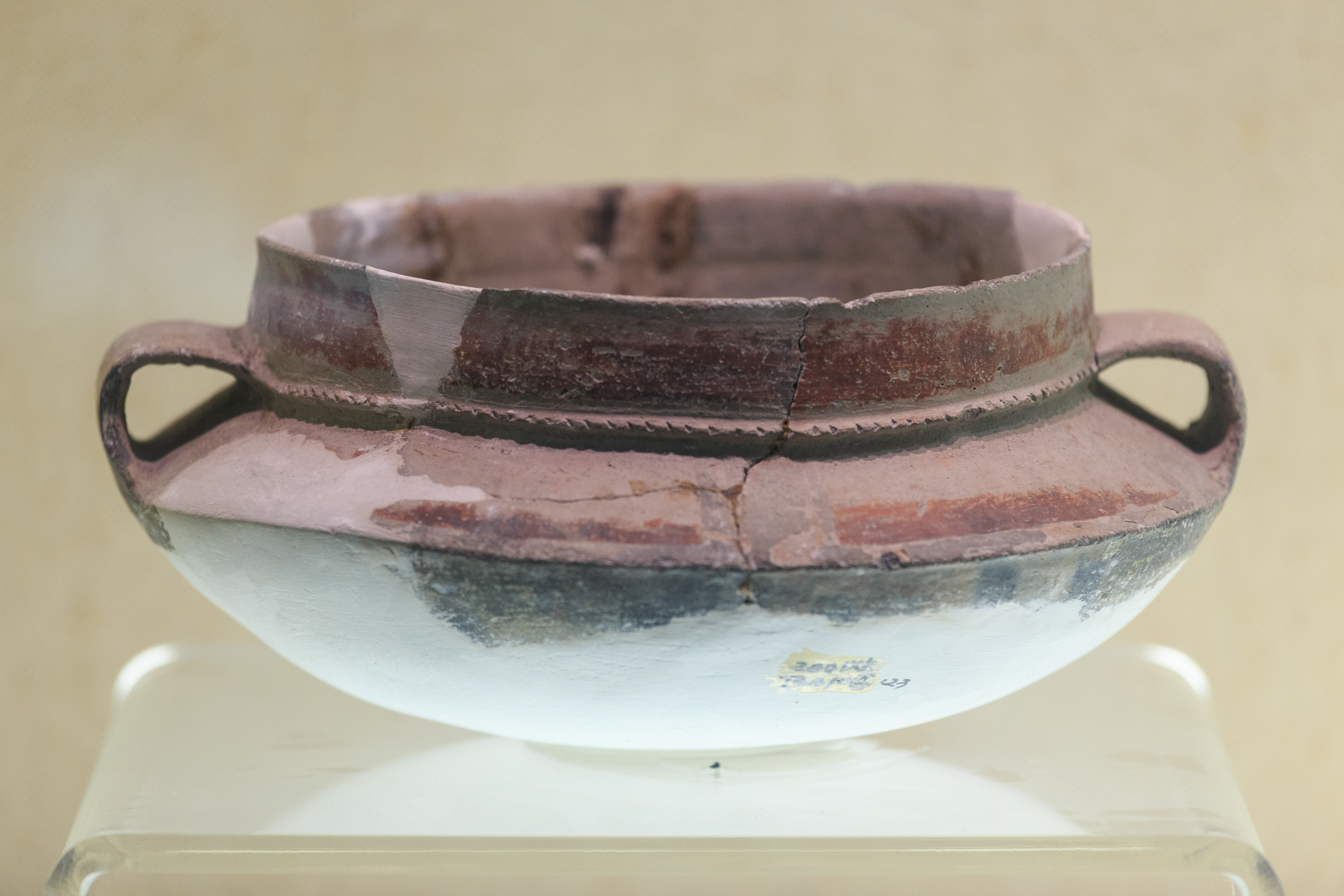
Big-mouth amphora from the site, Zhejiang Provincial Museum

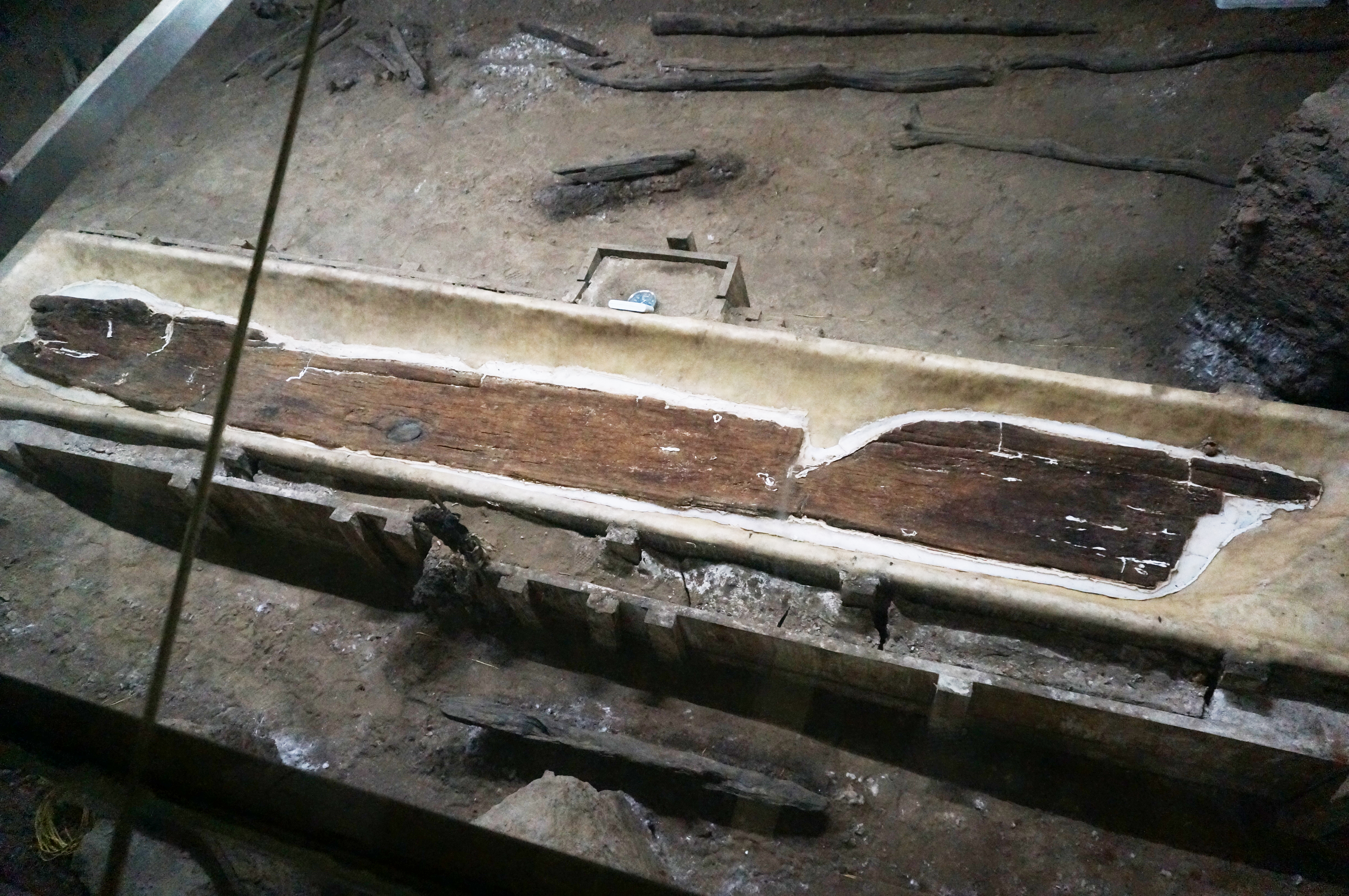
Dugout canoe excavated at Kuahuqiao site

Archaeologist Yan Wenming (严文明) has researched the site since the beginning. He uncovered a community of wooden dwellings that was constructed on stilts over the marshy wetlands.

Large quantities of stoneware, unglazed pottery, sophisticated painted pottery, jade artifacts, and other cultural relics were found. Villagers made pottery with wild rice as a bonding material. Many wooden, stone and pottery utensils were also unearthed from the site.

According to Yan Wenming,

"The culture of Kuahuqiao is very unique. It can hardly be compared to any other ancient cultures discovered in the province, and we found it difficult to put it into the cultural chronology within our knowledge."

In 2001, a second excavation was also carried out. In the same year, Kuahuqiao culture was recognised as one of top 10 most important archaeological discoveries of the year in China.

Kuahuqiao was entered in the official list of the Monuments of the People's Republic of China in 2006.

== Discoveries ==
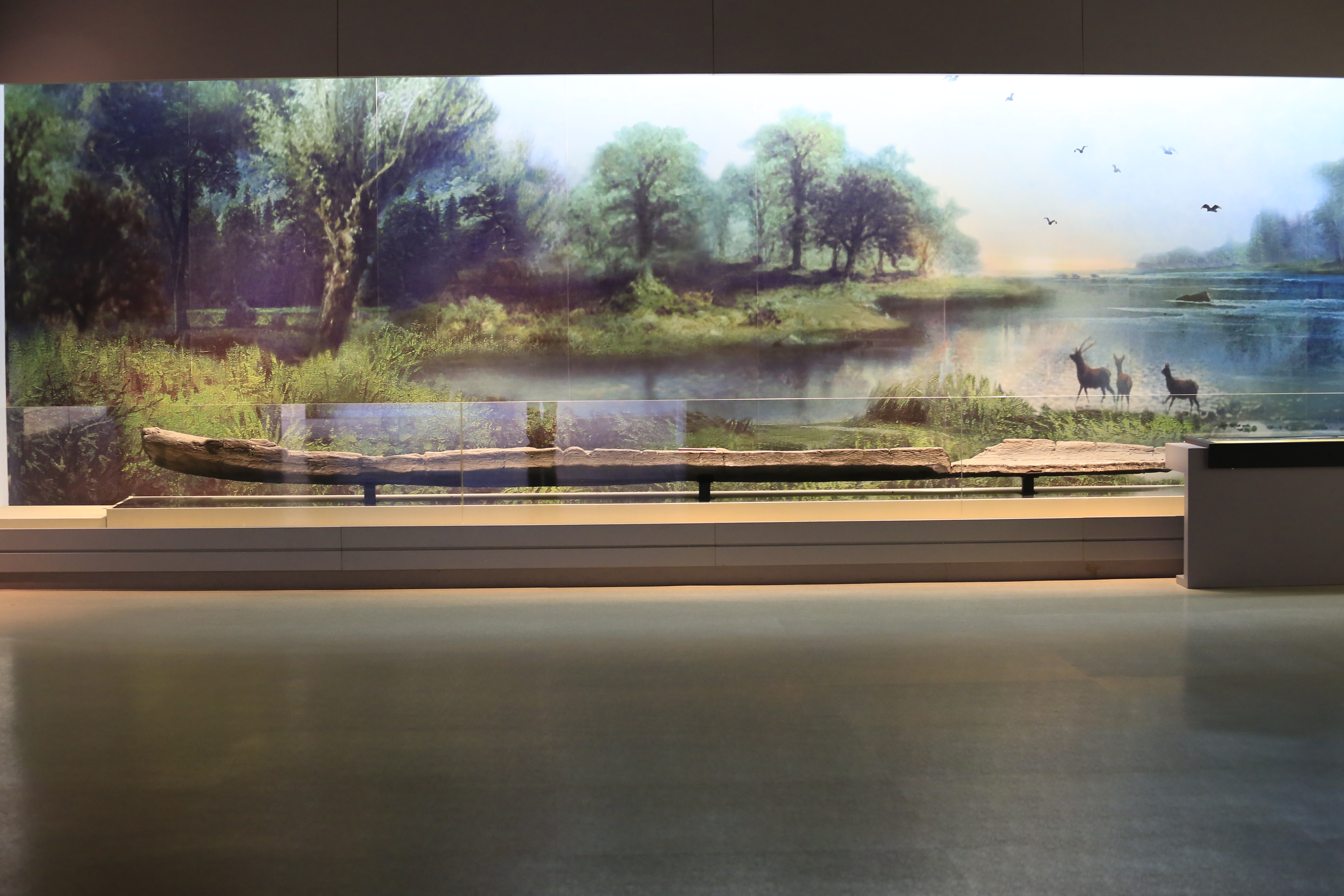
Ancient canoe from Kuahuqiao, exhibited at the Zhejiang Provincial Museum

During recent excavations, numerous well-preserved organic remains were found. They indicate that rice, dogs and pigs had already been domesticated by villagers and established that paddy rice cultivation was already practiced in China 7700 years ago. This evidence was well-dated, and may be the earliest evidence for rice cultivation. It was found by a team led by Cheng Zong of Durham University in UK.

According to Gary Crawford, of the University of Toronto at Mississauga, this new evidence is "an important contribution to understanding agricultural origins in the rice regions of East Asia."

A very early dugout canoe was revealed; this demonstrates the earliest technology for constructing this type of watercraft in China, and perhaps the world.

The earliest domesticated peach was found here. The second oldest remains of peach have been found at Neolithic Tianluoshan site, also in Zhejiang Province.

== See also ==
- Hemudu culture
- Majiabang culture
- List of Neolithic sites in China
