= Xinle culture =

Neolithic culture in northeast China

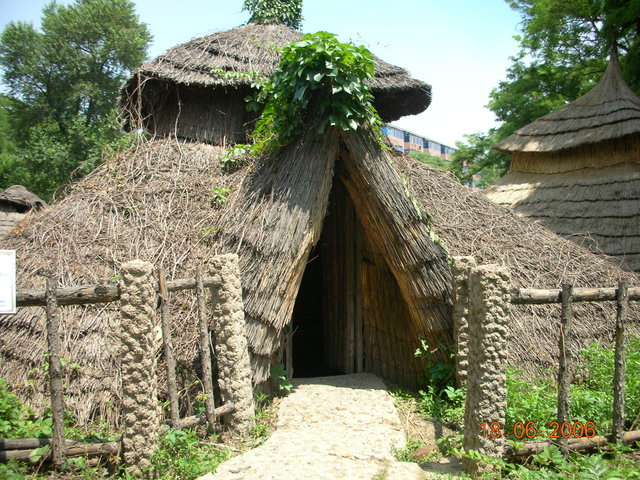
A house

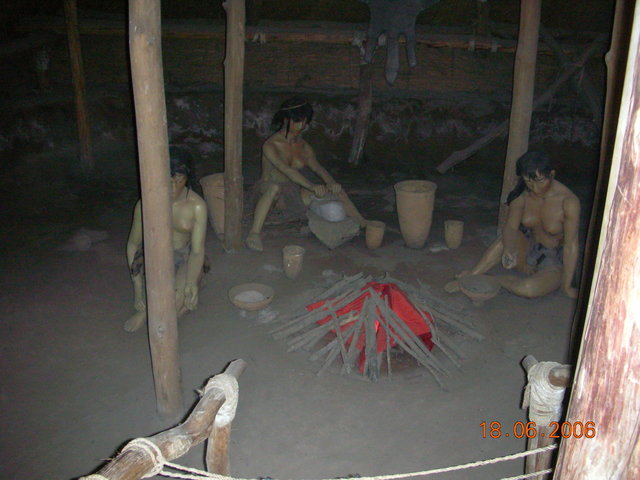
Depiction of life inside a house

Xinle culture and contemporary cultures and polities c. 5000 BC

The Xinle culture (新樂文化) (5500–4800 BC) was a Neolithic culture in northeast China, found primarily around the lower Liao River on the Liaodong Peninsula in Liaoning. The culture showed evidence of millet cultivation and pig domestication. The type site at Xinle was discovered in the Huanggu District of Shenyang, Liaoning.

The site is named after an old inn, upon whose grounds the remains were first discovered.

== Naming ==
The site of the ancient settlement was discovered in the grounds of an old accommodation block for an electrical factory. The accommodation block was called the Xinle Dormitory (新樂宿舍) and hence the discovery was named the Xinle Relic. When it was discovered that the settlement was that of a hitherto unknown civilization, the whole civilization was named after the relic and hence became known as the Xinle civilization. Although more recent discoveries in nearby areas have been extremely significant, especially one in Xinmin, the original name has prevailed.

== Excavations ==
In 1973, excavations at the site discovered evidence for some 40 neolithic houses. Artifacts uncovered during the dig included stone tools, pottery, jade, bone tools, wood carvings, and refined coal.

In 1978, another dig uncovered yet more artifacts including one wooden carving that was some 7,200 years old, presumably a type of totem worshipped by the clan. No other find in the whole of Shenyang has been older, and the find is one of the oldest wooden carvings found anywhere in the world.

== Museum ==
In 1984, the Museum of the Xinle Civilization (新樂遺址博物館) was founded.

The museum is divided into two sections, north and south. The southern section contains displays of the various artifacts unearthed during the various excavations that have taken place on the 44-acre (180,000 m^{2}) site. The northern section contains a reconstruction of a 7,000-year-old Xinle village. Some of the houses in the settlement contain representations of life 7,000 years ago.

== Gallery ==
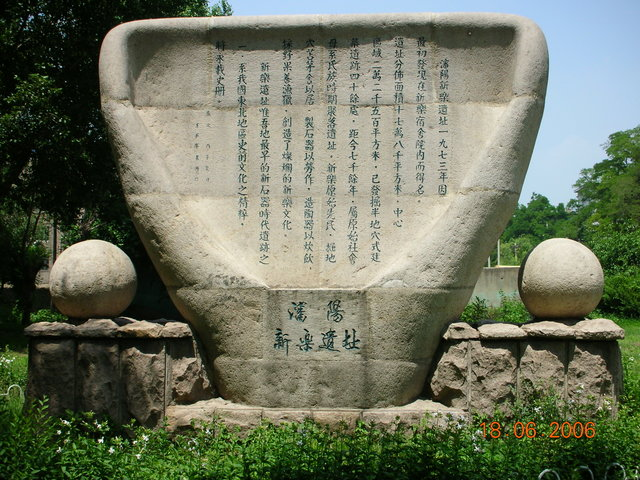
Main entrance

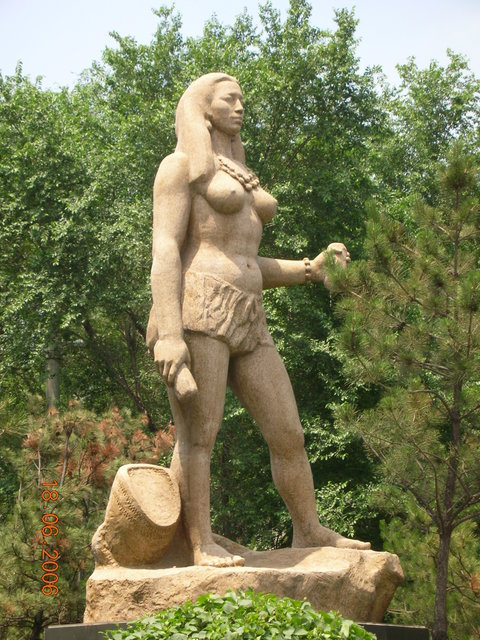
Statue advertising the museum

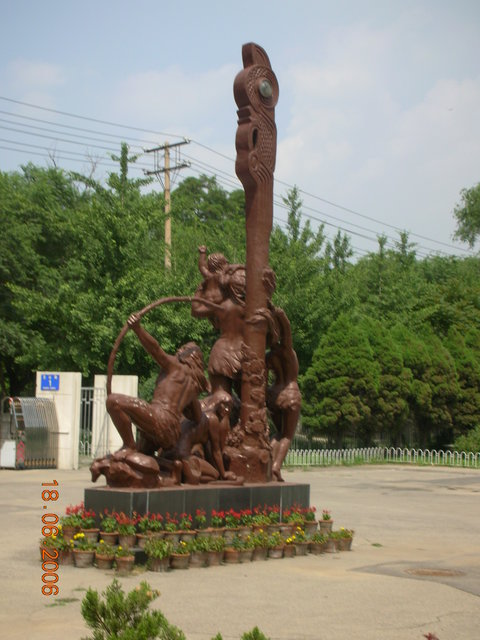
Statue outside museum gates

== See also ==
- List of Neolithic cultures of China
- Hongshan culture
