= Lower Xiajiadian culture =

Archaeological culture in China

- General location of the Lower Xiajiadian culture, and contemporary Asian polities c. 2000 BCE
- Dates: 2200-1600 BCE
- Preceded by: Early Neolithic (7000-4500 BCE); Hongshan (4500-3000 BCE); Xiaoheyan (3000-2000 BCE)
- Followed by: Upper Xiajiadian (1000-600 BCE)

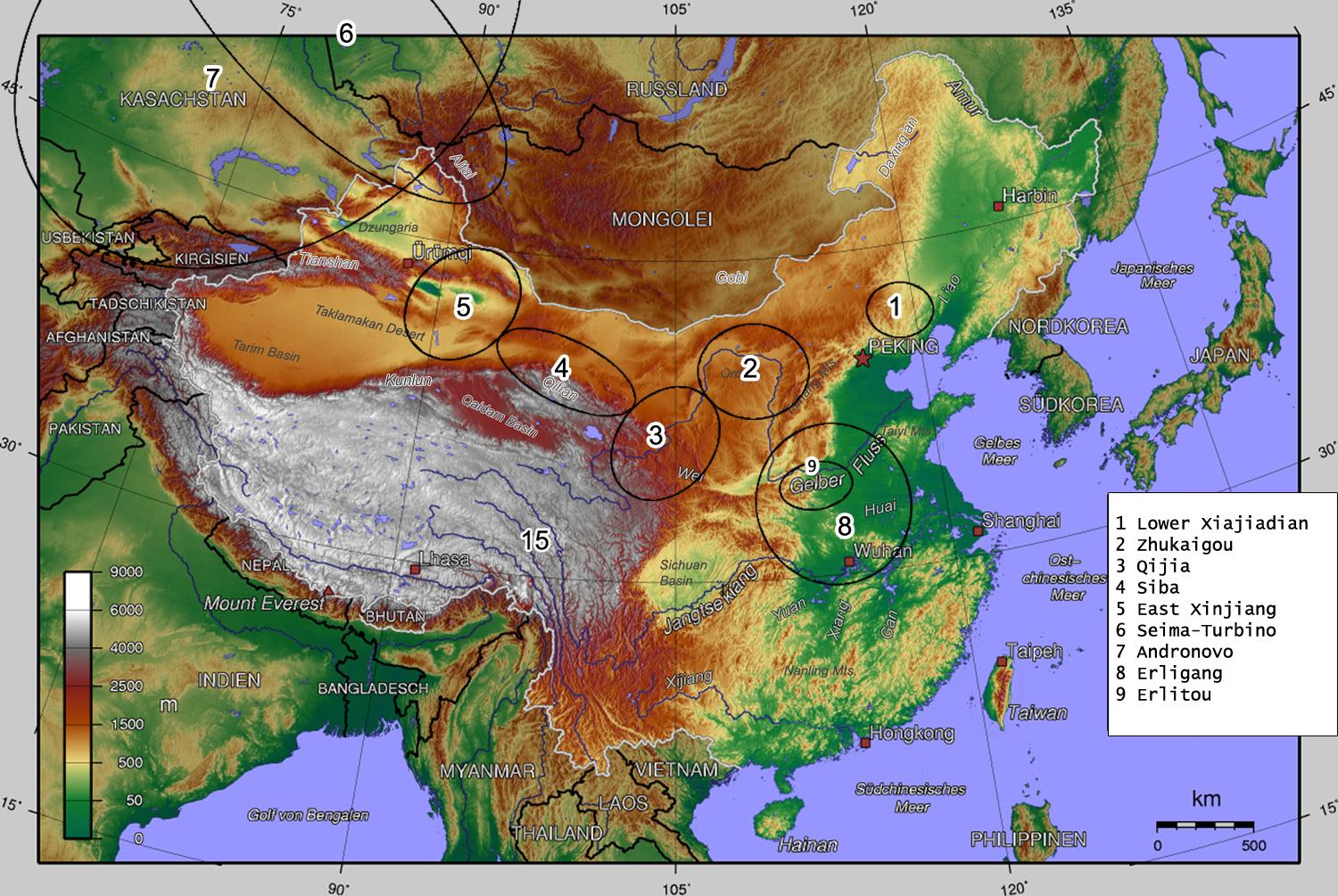
Transition from Neolithic to Bronze Age in China and to the northwest: Lower Xiajiadian culture is marked as #1

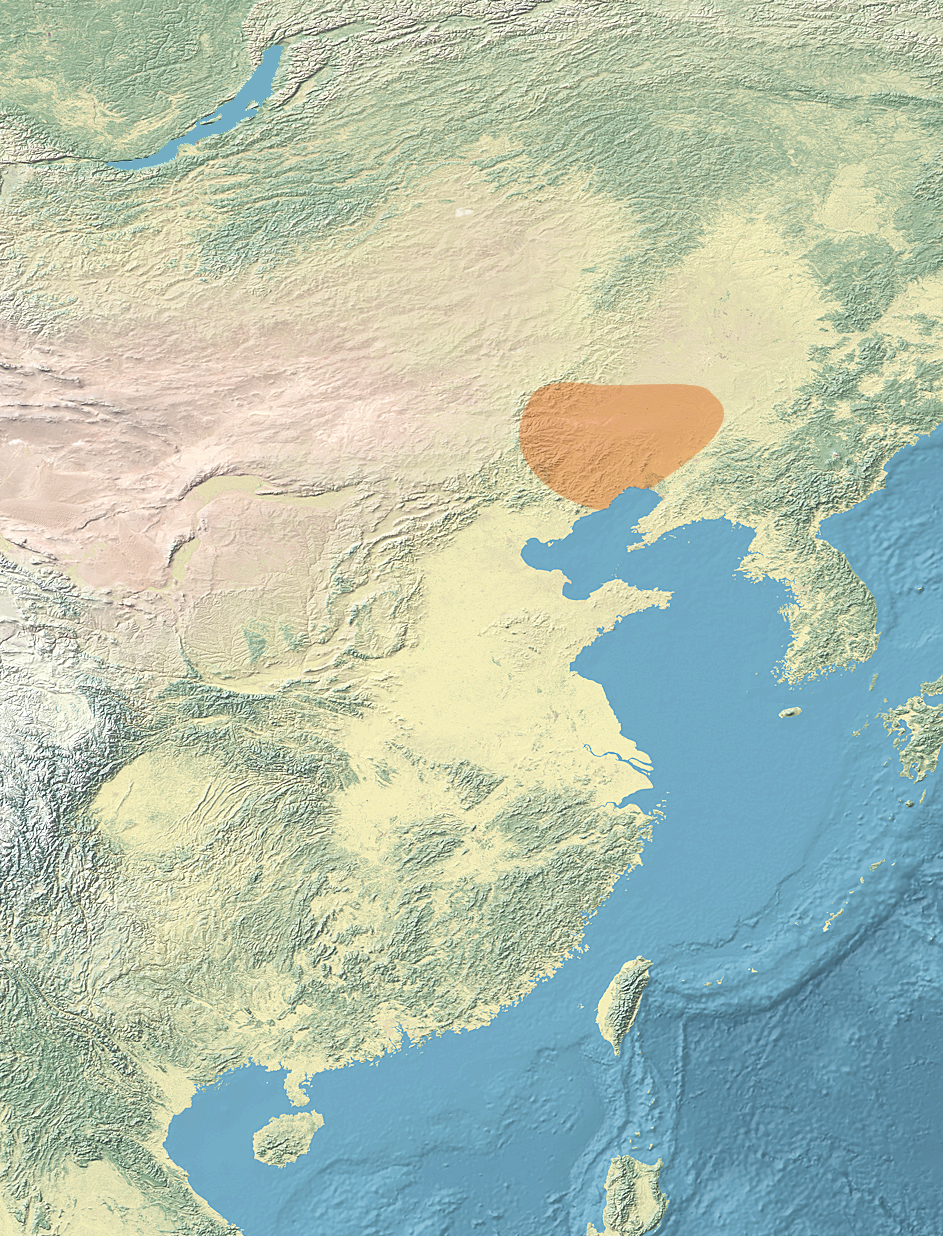
Lower Xiajiadian culture area.

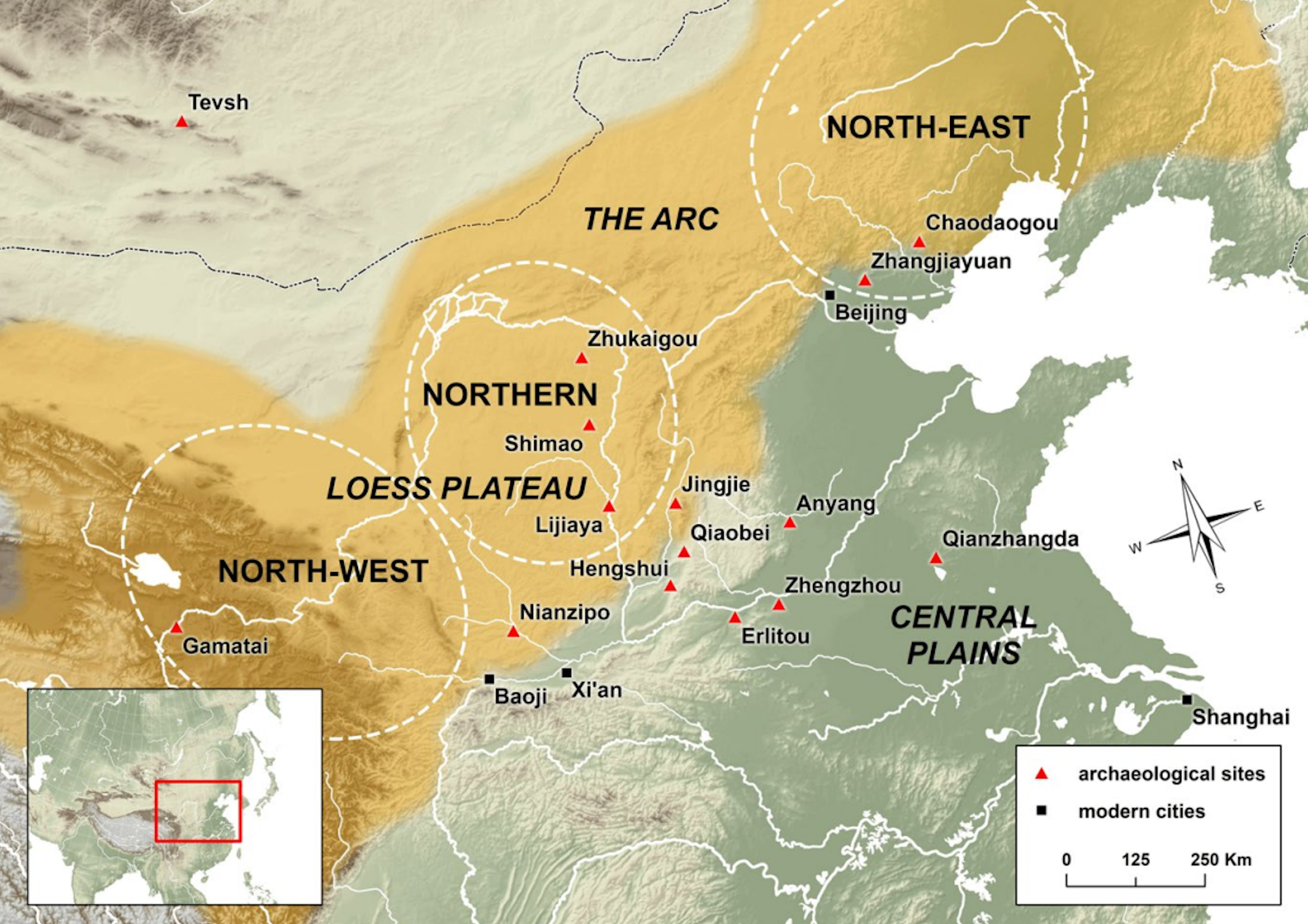
The Lower Xiajiadian culture was part of the "Arc of the eastern Steppe", next to the Central Plain of China.

The Lower Xiajiadian culture (simplified Chinese: 夏家店下层文化; traditional Chinese: 夏家店下層文化; pinyin: Xiàjiādiàn xiàcéng wénhuà; 2200–1600 BC) is an archaeological culture in Northeast China, found mainly in southeastern Inner Mongolia, northern Hebei, and western Liaoning, China. Subsistence was based on millet farming supplemented with animal husbandry and hunting. Archaeological sites have yielded the remains of pigs, dogs, sheep, and cattle. The culture built permanent settlements and achieved relatively high population densities. The population levels reached by the Lower Xiajiadian culture in the Chifeng region would not be matched until the Liao dynasty. The culture was preceded by the Hongshan culture, through the transitional Xiaoheyan culture. The type site is represented by the lower layer at Xiajiadian in Chifeng, Inner Mongolia.

Archaeogenetic data shows that "the West Liao River Valley was a contact zone between northern steppe tribes and the Central Plain farming population. The formation and development of the Lower Xiajiadian Culture population was likely a complex process affected by admixture of ethnically different people". The Lower Xiajiadian culture remains displayed high genetic affinity to "Yellow River farmers" but were not identical to them, in contrast, the Upper Xiajiadian remains displayed high genetic affinity to Ancient Northeast Asian Amur hunter-gatherers and later Xianbei. Archaeological and DNA evidence supports examples that the people of the Lower Xiajiadian Culture immigrating to the south and contributed to the gene pool of the Central Plain population during the Bronze Age.

Stone, bone, and pottery artefacts were discovered at Lower Xiajiadian sites, while gold, lead, lacquer, jade, copper, and bronze artefacts are also found. The most commonly found copper and bronze artefacts are dagger-axes with an integrated handle, mace head, piers, knives, and earrings. Mainly small artifacts only were made of bronze, such as dagger and ornaments, with close similarities de the Zhukaigou culture in central Inner Mongolia, or the Qijia culture and the Siba culture in the Hexi Corridor, but major differences from the Erligang culture of the Central Plain. This emerging bronze technology is considered to have been adopted from the Central Asian steppes, and seems to have been key to the introduction of bronze technology into China. The culture had tin-bronze knives, of a type thought to have been developed in Western Siberia before 1900 BCE. In particular, bronze knife technology was probably transferred from the Southern Siberian Munkhkhairkhan culture to various Chinese cultures, such as the Qijia culture, Erlitou culture or Lower Xiajiadian culture, where very similar knives have been found.

Belgian linguist Martine Robbeets proposed that the Lower Xiajiadian culture may have spoken Proto-Mongolic-Tugusic, a hypothetical precursor language to both Mongolic and Tugusic languages, although others contend that it is more likely that the Upper Xiajiadian culture were Proto-Mongolic-Tugusic, rather than Lower Xiajiadian.

People of the Lower Xiajiadian practiced oracle bone divination. The culture prepared its oracle bones by drilling and polishing the bones before heating them. Inscriptions are generally not found on examples of oracle bones of the Lower Xiajiadian.

People had good access to local sources of stone, primarily basalt, which were often used in construction and tool-making. Lower Xiajiadian houses were typically round, made from mud and stone, and were built with stone walls. Lower Xiajiadian settlements were built near and were protected by cliffs or steep slopes. Stone walls were sometimes erected around the non-sloped perimeter of its settlement. Walls were not thick. Walls with watchtowers and were built by sandwiching a rammed earth core with two sides of stone walls.

There are differing views among Chinese specialists on the origins of the people of the northern part of Lower Xiajiadian culture. One view is that they were perhaps related to the Sushen, who the Shang and Zhou named the non-Chinese people from the Northeast. Another view is that they were the Northern tribal conglomerations, like the Shanrong, Guzhu, Guifang, and Tufang.

Professor Jin Jing-fan (of Jilin University) believes that certain parts of Shang culture has its origins in Dongbei. Along with professors Gan Zhi-geng and Guo Dashun, they believe that Lower Xiajiadian contributed to some of the origins of both Shang and Yan cultures.

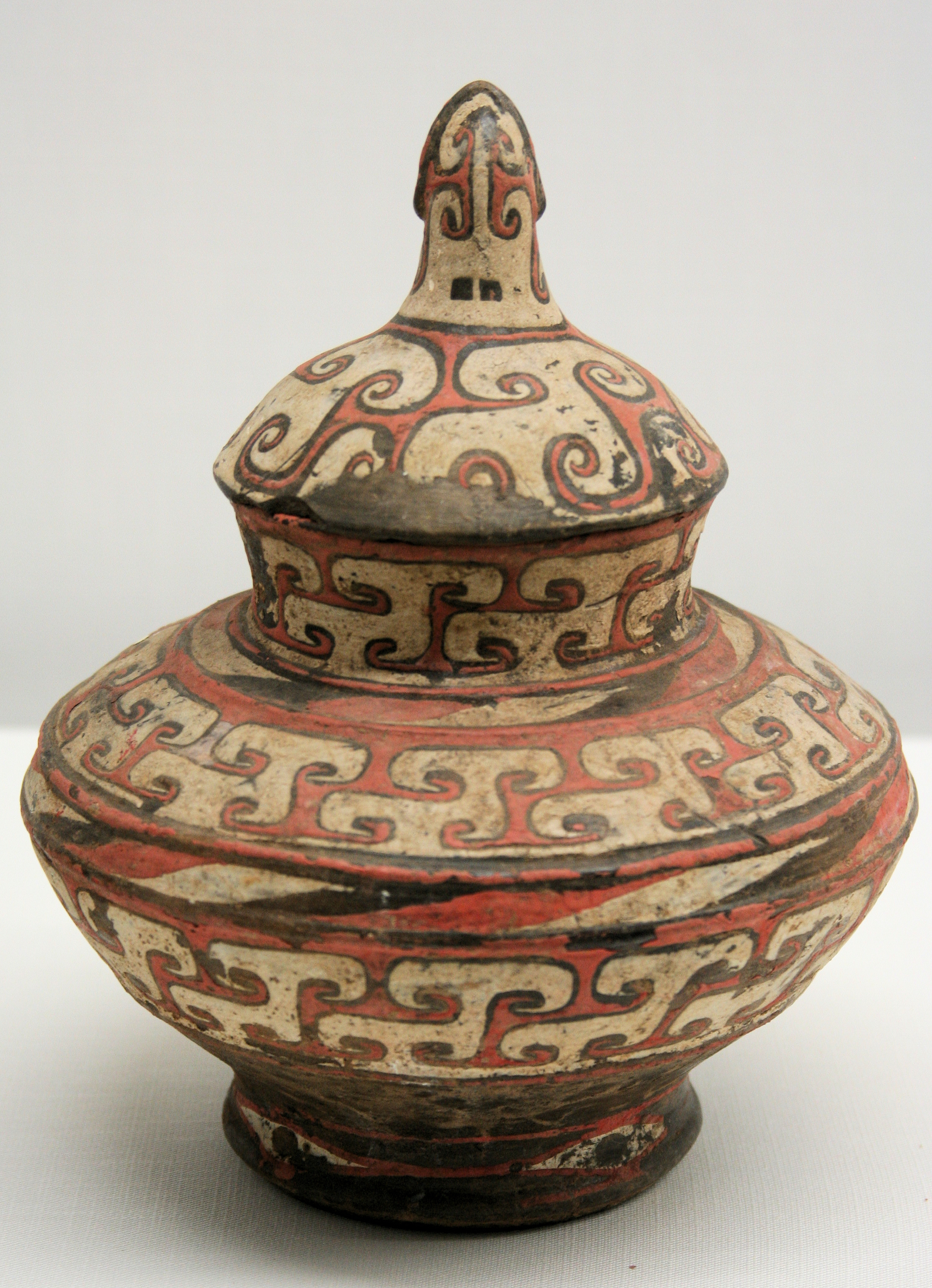
Colour-painted pottery pot from the Lower Xiajiadian culture, 2000-1500 BCE. Excavated from Dadianzi, Aohanqi, Inner Mongolia. Capital Museum, Beijing

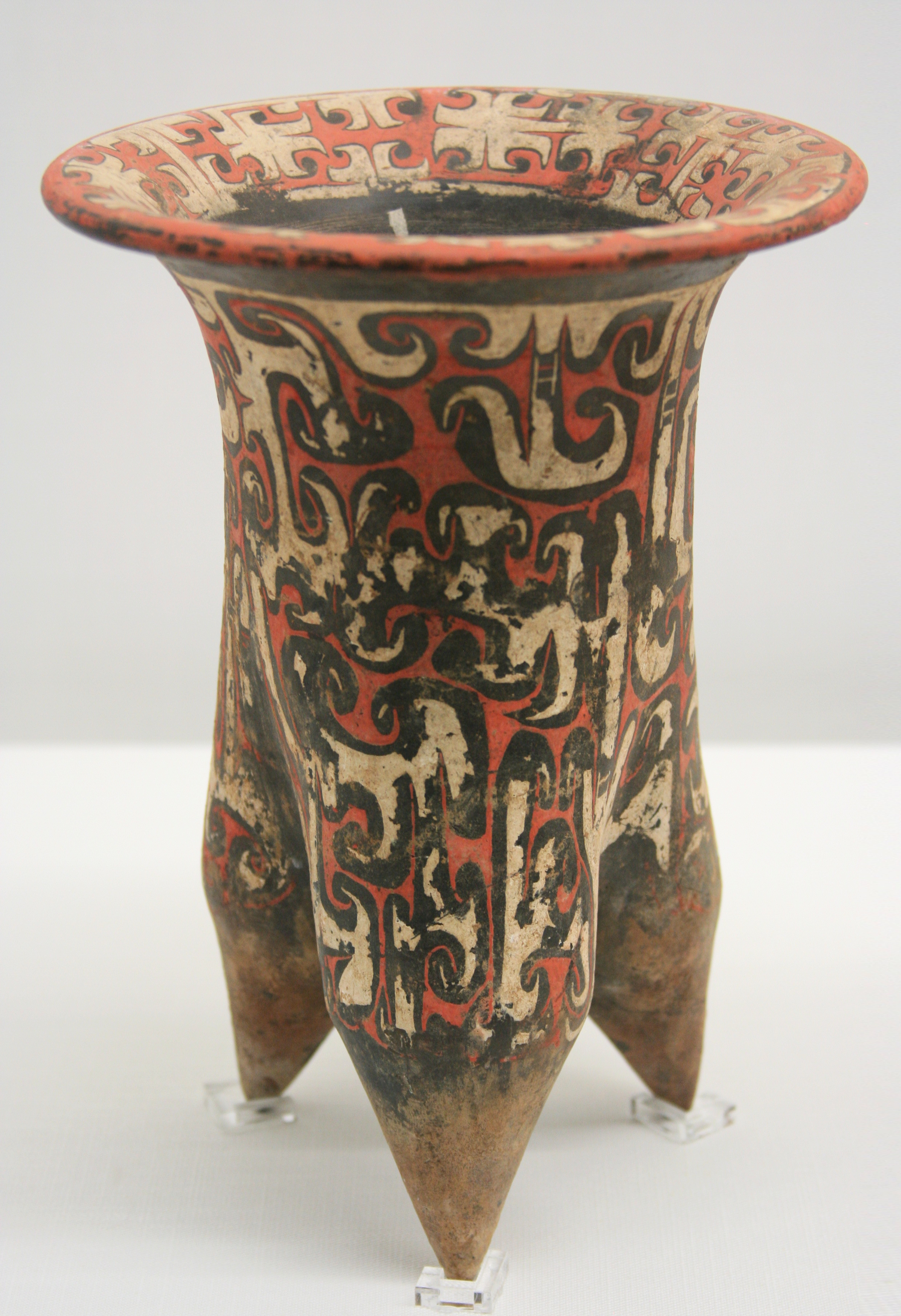
Colour-painted pottery pot from the Lower Xiajiadian culture, 2000-1500 BCE. Excavated from Dadianzi, Aohanqi, Inner Mongolia. Capital Museum, Beijing

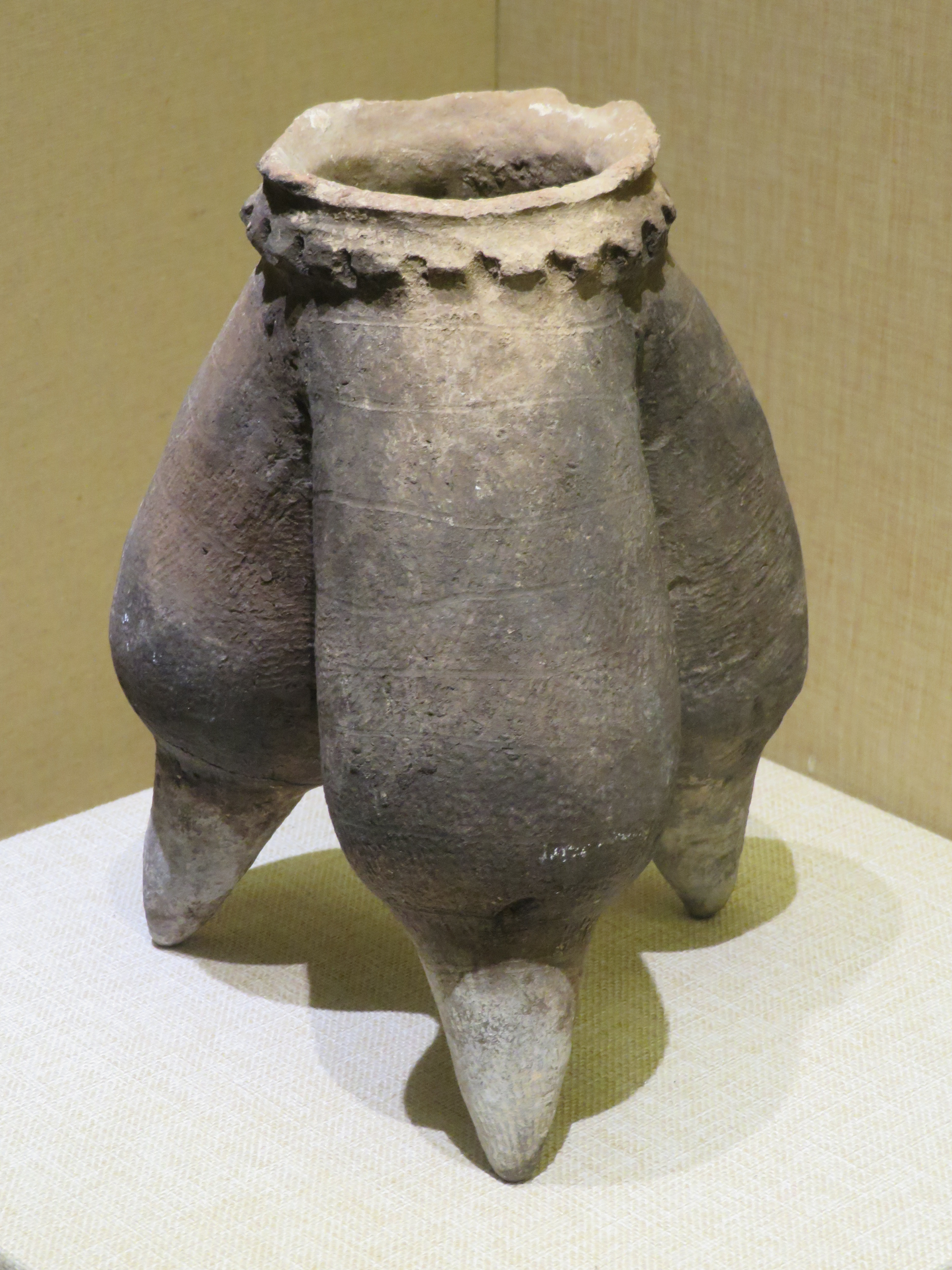
Pottery pot from the Lower Xiajiadian culture

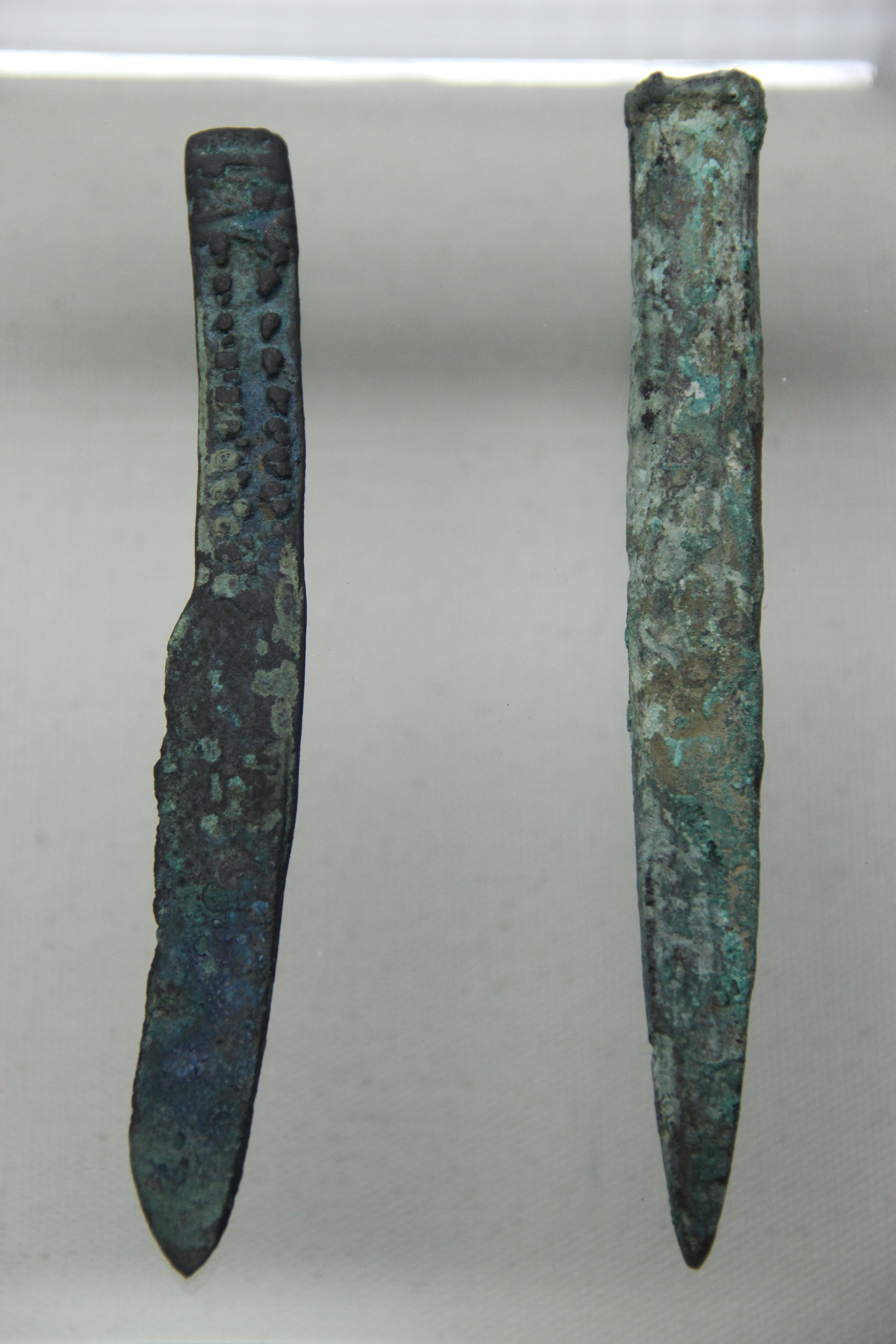
Bronze knife and chisel, Lower Xiajiadian culture

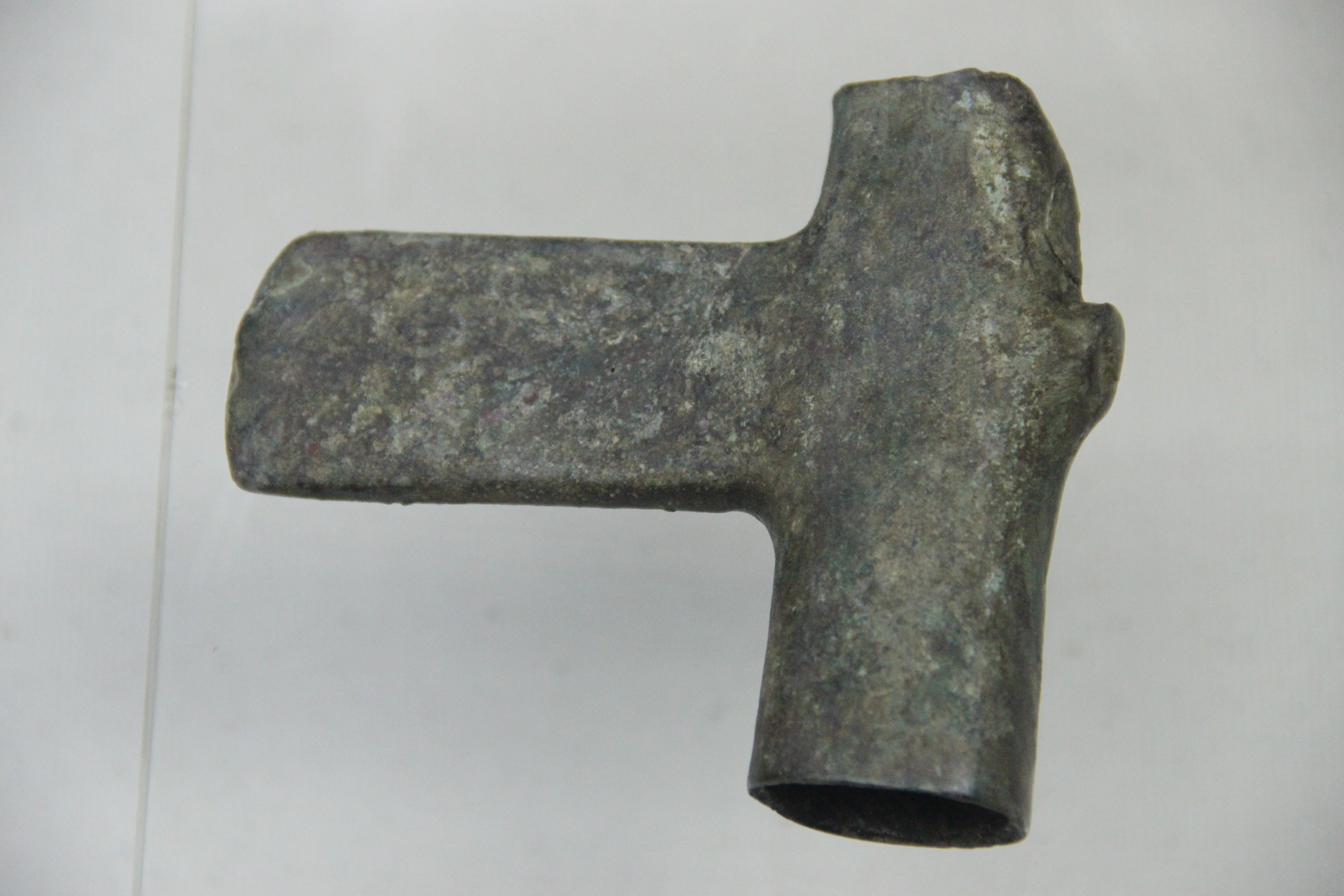
Bronze axe and chisel, Lower Xiajiadian culture

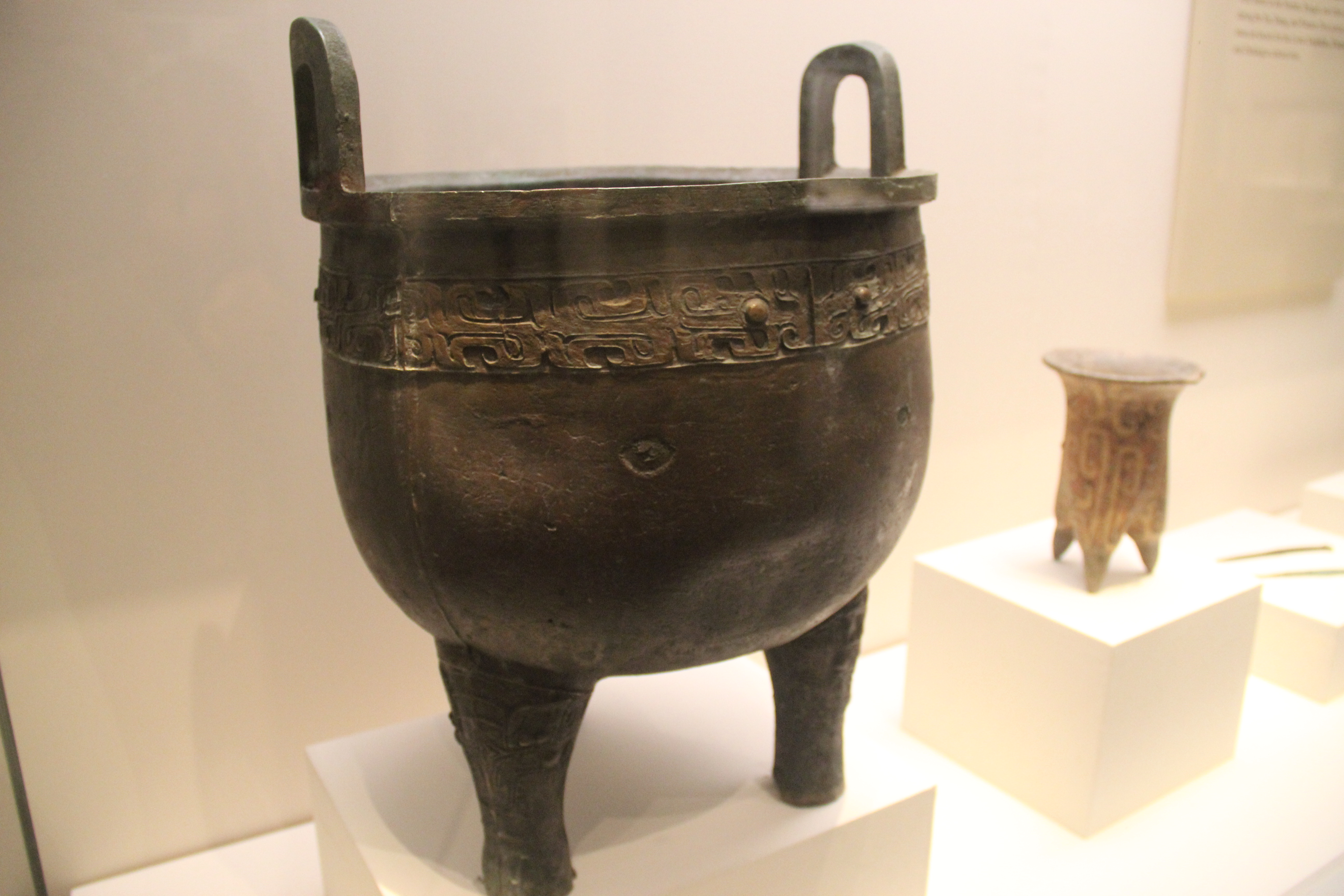
Bronze Ding, Lower Xiajiadian culture

== See also ==
- Yan (state)
- Upper Xiajiadian culture
- Xinglonggou
- Yueshi culture
