= Xar Moron River =

River in Inner Mongolia

Coordinates: 43.432800°N 120.777600°E

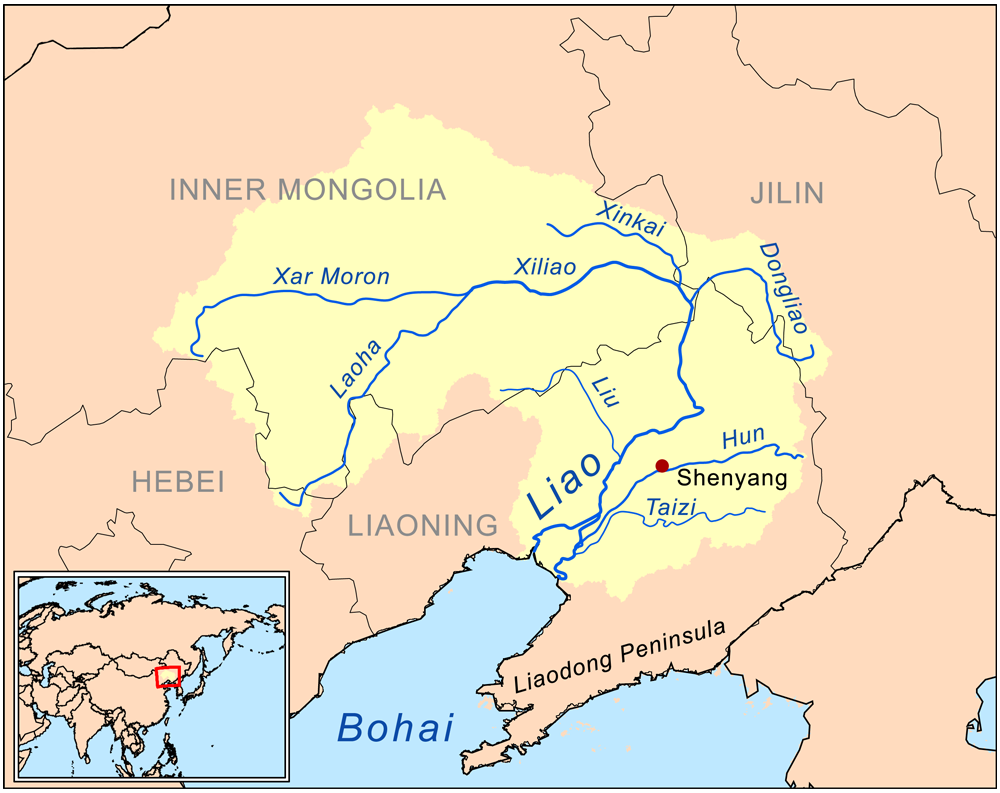
This is a map of the Liao River drainage basin.

The Xar Moron river (Mongolian: Shar mörön Шар мөрөн, "Yellow River"; Chinese: 西拉木伦河, 西拉沐沦河, or 西拉沐伦河; pinyin: Xilamulun) is a river in Inner Mongolia, in northeast China. It flows through the grasslands of that region, forming a valley that is hospitable to both farming and herding. The valley was once home to the Khitan people.

The Xar Moron is the source of the Xiliao River (西辽河), which in turn is one of the headwaters of the Liao River.

The musical instrument Xiqin (奚琴), the ancestor of China's huqin family of bowed string instruments, is believed to have originated here with the Khitans, who were formerly called Xi (奚) by the Chinese.
