= Xiaoheyan culture =

Archaeological culture in China

Xiaoheyan Culture
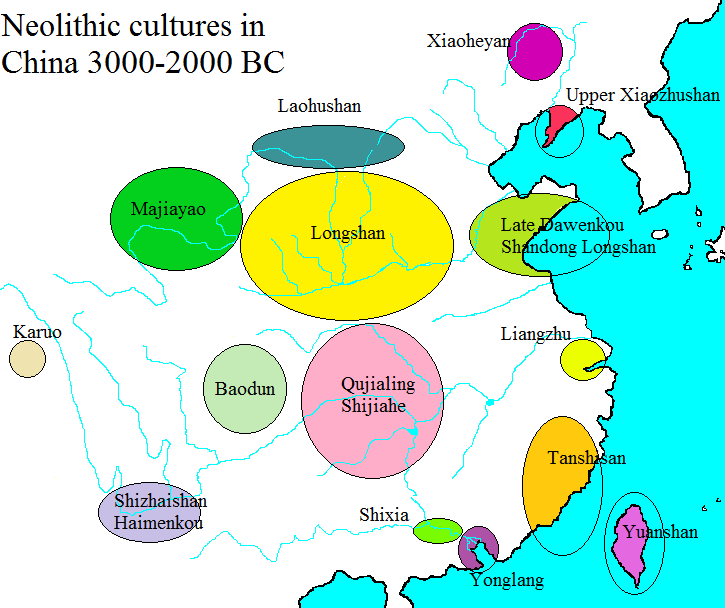
- Geographical range: Aohan Banner, Inner Mongolia, China
- Period: Neolithic
- Dates: c. 3000–2500BC
- Type site: Xiaoheyan
- Preceded by: Hongshan Culture (红山文化)
- Followed by: Lower Xiajiadian culture (夏家店文化)

Chinese name
- Traditional Chinese: 小河沿文化
- Simplified Chinese: 小河沿文化
Transcriptions
Standard Mandarin
- Hanyu Pinyin: xiǎo hé yán wén huà

The Xiaoheyan culture was a Neolithic culture that existed in Aohan Banner, Inner Mongolia, China from approximately 3500–2000 BC. The culture was named after the site discovered at Xiaoheyan, Aohan Banner.

== History and distribution ==
Xiaoheyan Culture is named after the site of Nantai, Xiaoheyan Township, Aohan Banner, Inner Mongolia, excavated in the 1970s. Later, multiple archaeological sites with this cultural feature were discovered in succession. Up to now, scholars still have some disputes about the age range, characteristics, and origin relationship between this culture and other archaeological cultures. However, most scholars believe that the distribution area of Xiaoheyan culture extends throughout the northern and southern regions of Yanshan Mountain. It originated in the late Yangshao culture and disappeared in the Longshan culture period. Recently, Suo Xiufen and others pointed out that the Xiaoheyan culture was formed on the basis of local culture (Zhaobaogou culture, Fuhe culture, and Hongshan culture), constantly absorbing external cultural factors around it, roughly dating from about 3500 to 2000 BC. According to its distribution and cultural characteristics, the Xiaoheyan culture can be divided into three local types: Shipeng Mountain, Xueshan Phase I, and Wufang. In the early stage, from the fourth stage of Banpo to the second stage of Miaodigou, the Xiaoheyan culture spread throughout the northern and southern regions of Yanshan, reaching Zhangjiakou and Datong in the west, and Shijiazhuang in the south. In the later stage (the Longshan period), the Xiaoheyan culture at the southern foot of Yanshan was replaced by the Hougang second stage culture and the Longshan culture of the Longshan era in the lower reaches of the Yellow River, while the area north of Yanshan remains the Xiaoheyan culture.

== Features ==
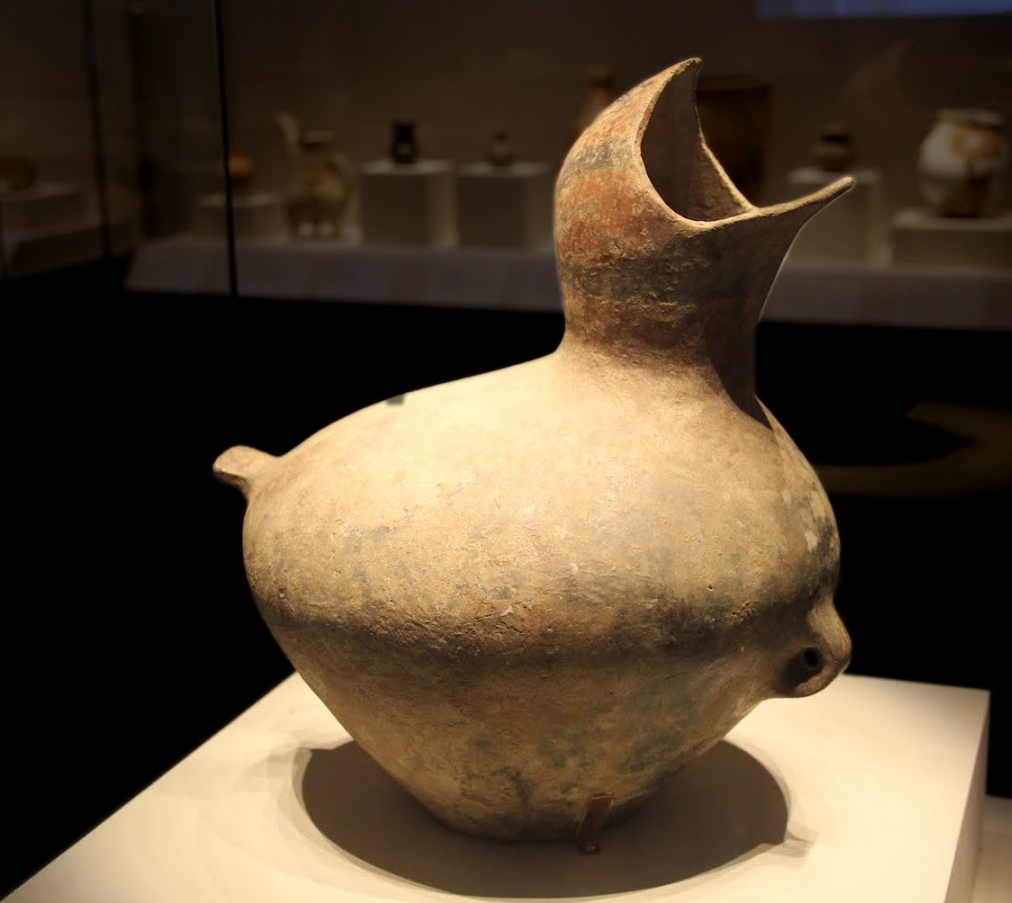
Neolithic bird-shaped pottery jar, Xiaoheyan Culture, Inner Mongolia. 2900-2700 BCE.

The Xiaoheyan culture is a culture of the Neolithic Age, which has been in a highly developed stage compared to previous cultures. During this period, people lived a stable and settled life, mainly relying on agriculture, supplemented by livestock breeding and hunting to maintain their livelihoods. The Pottery industry and handmade textile industry have been relatively developed, occupying an important position in society at that time. At that time, people lived in oval and semi-underground buildings, some with single rooms, and some with two rooms. The building has a small mouth and a large bottom, with its doors set in the south. Some houses have circular fire chambers, while others have column holes on both sides of the middle soil stove. There are also cellars around for storing food, with the deepest reaching 1.9 meters. The representative site in this regard is the Nantai Site (南台地遗址群).

During this period, people no longer used the large stone tools from the Hongshan Culture period but used more refined grinding stone tools, such as perforated stone shovels, stone axes, stone arrowheads, sharp and strong tools, scrapers, stone blades, and bone knives. At this time, textile technology was relatively advanced, and the spinning wheels used were made of pottery or stone, varying in size. The largest one found weighed 98 grams, while the smallest one weighed 9 grams. Clothes have been divided into thick and thin threads, and from the perspective of excavated fabrics, they are more delicate than the current sackcloth. In the excavated fabric, there are between 6 and 8 warp and weft threads in 1 square centimeter. The bone needles used are very sharp, with tiny round holes on the flat needle nose, which is only 0.2mm.

== See also ==
- Neolithic
- Aohan Banner
- Hongshan culture
