= Zhaobaogou culture =

Archaeological culture in China

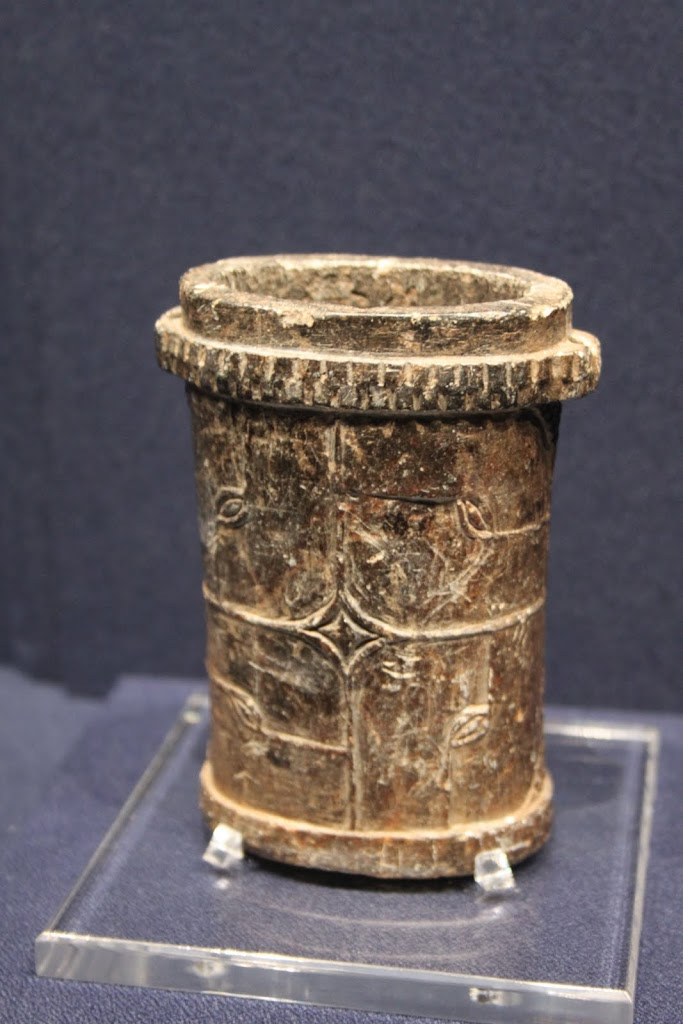
Jade tube-shaped artifact, Zhaobaogou culture, Inner Mongolia, 5000-4400 BC.

Zhaobaogou culture and contemporary cultures and polities c. 5000 BC

The Zhaobaogou culture (Chinese: 趙宝溝文化) (5400–4500 BC) was a Neolithic culture in northeast China, found primarily in the Luan River valley in Inner Mongolia and northern Hebei. The culture produced sand-tempered, incised pottery vessels with geometric and zoomorphic designs. The culture also produced stone and clay human figurines.

The type site at Zhaobaogou, excavated in 1986, was discovered in Aohan Banner, Chifeng, Inner Mongolia. The site covers an area of around 90,000 square metres (22 acres) and at least 20 structures.

== See also ==
- List of Neolithic cultures of China
- Hongshan culture
- Xinglongwa culture
