= Xiajiadian culture =

Xiajiadian culture is the name of two distinct Bronze Age cultures in northeast China:

- Lower Xiajiadian culture (2200-1600 BCE)
- Upper Xiajiadian culture (1000-600 BCE)
