= Eastern Barbarians =

In Chinese history, Eastern Barbarians may refer to:

- Dongyi 東夷, various ethnic groups to the East of China
- Donghu people 東胡, an ancient ethnic group
