= Donghu people =

697–150 BCE nomadic confederacy in northern China

- General location of the Donghu people, and contemporary Asian polities c. 500 BCE
- Dates: 700–150 BCE
- Preceded by: Upper Xiajiadian culture
- Followed by: Xiongnu; Yan Kingdom (Han dynasty)

The Donghu (/ˈdʊŋˌhuː/; simplified Chinese: 东胡; traditional Chinese: 東胡; pinyin: Dōnghú) were a tribal confederation of nomadic Hu people that were first recorded from the 7th century BCE and were taken over by the Xiongnu in 150 BCE. They lived in northern Hebei, southeastern Inner Mongolia and the western part of Liaoning, Jilin and Heilongjiang along the Yan Mountains and Greater Khingan Range.

== Name ==
=== Nomenclature ===
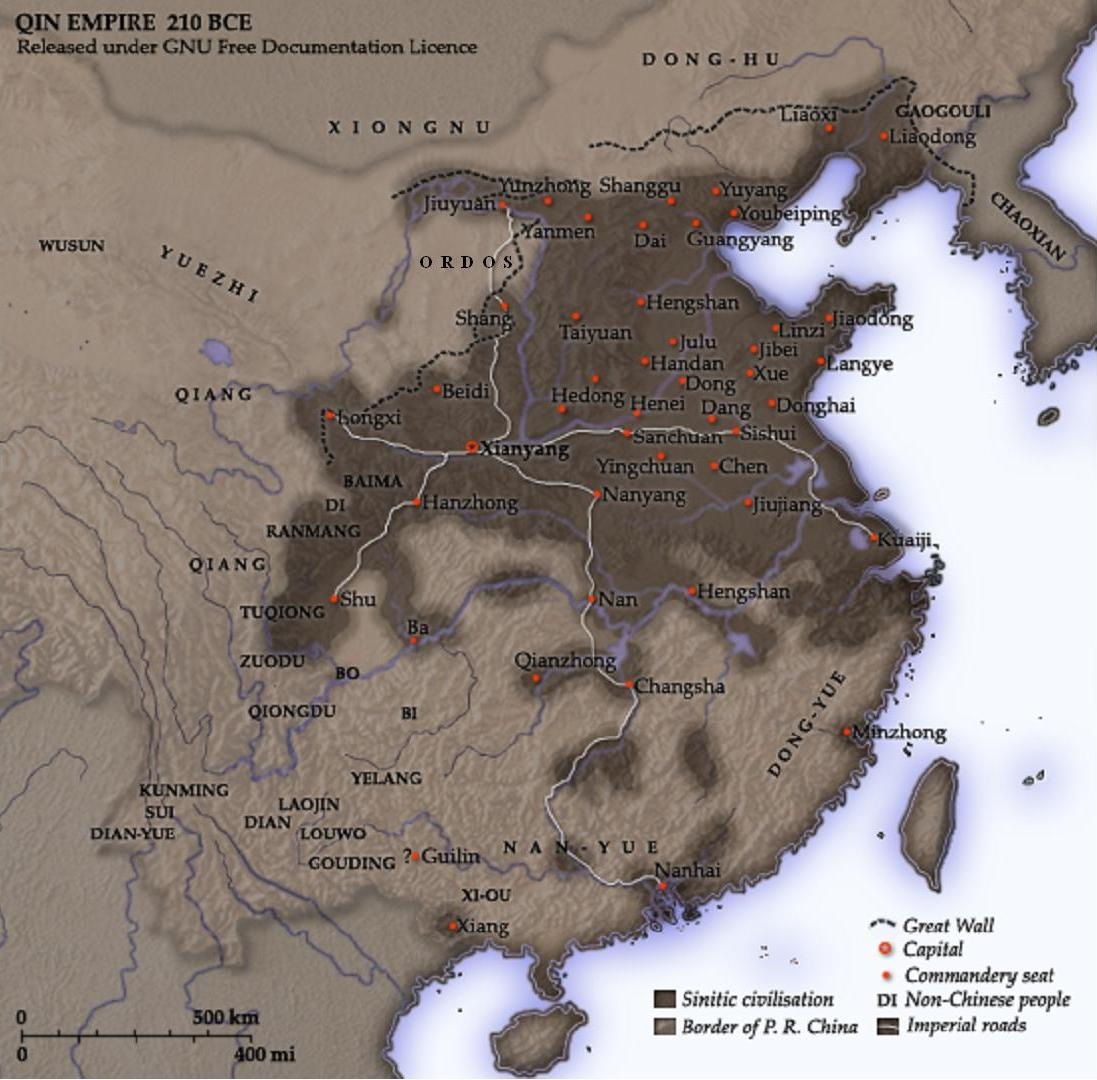
The Donghu were located to the northeast of Qin China in the 3rd century BCE.

The Classical Chinese name Chinese: 東胡 literally means "Eastern Barbarians". The term Dōnghú contrasts with the term Xīhú meaning "Western barbarians" (Chinese: 西胡, meaning "non-Chinese peoples in the west" and Five Barbarians 五胡 (Wǔ Hú) "five northern nomadic tribes involved in the Uprising of the Five Barbarians (304–316 CE)". Hill (2009:59) translates Xīhú as "Western Hu" and notes:

The term hu 胡 was used to denote non-Han Chinese populations. It is, rather unsatisfactorily, commonly translated as 'barbarian'. While sometimes it was used in this general way to describe people of non-Han descent, and carried the same negative overtones of the English term, this was not always the case. Most frequently, it was used to denote people, usually of Caucasoid or partial Caucasoid appearance, living to the north and west of China. (2009:453)

In 307 BCE, the 胡 Hú proper, encompassing both the eastern Dōnghú (東胡, "Eastern Hu") and the western Linhu (林胡, "Forest Hu"), were mentioned as a non-Chinese people who were neighbors of Zhao and skilled at mounted archery (a military tactic which King Wuling of Zhao would later adopt). However, the term Hu can also refer to a variety of different races and different ethnic groups. It was used by Han Chinese to describe anyone who is not of ethnic Han Chinese descent and were considered barbarians: for example, Sima Qian also used Hu to refer to the Xiongnu, who were then ruled by Touman Chanyu, once expelled by Qin general Meng Tian north from the Ordos Loop, yet able to regain their territory following the Qin Empire's collapse. All Hu workmen were famed for their skills at making bows and carts even without specialization.

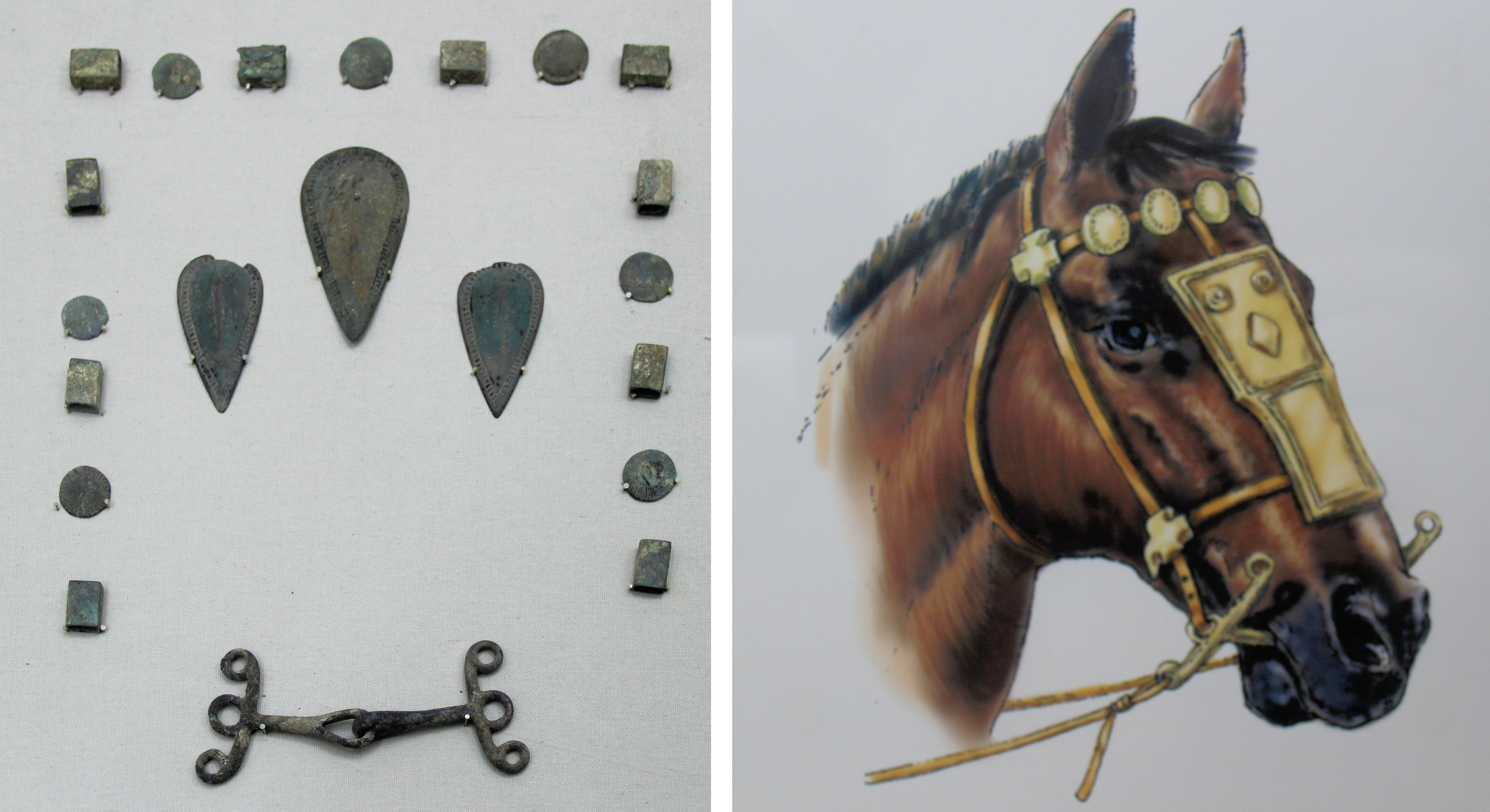
Horse bit and harness ornaments. Upper Xiajiadian culture. Inner Mongolia Museum

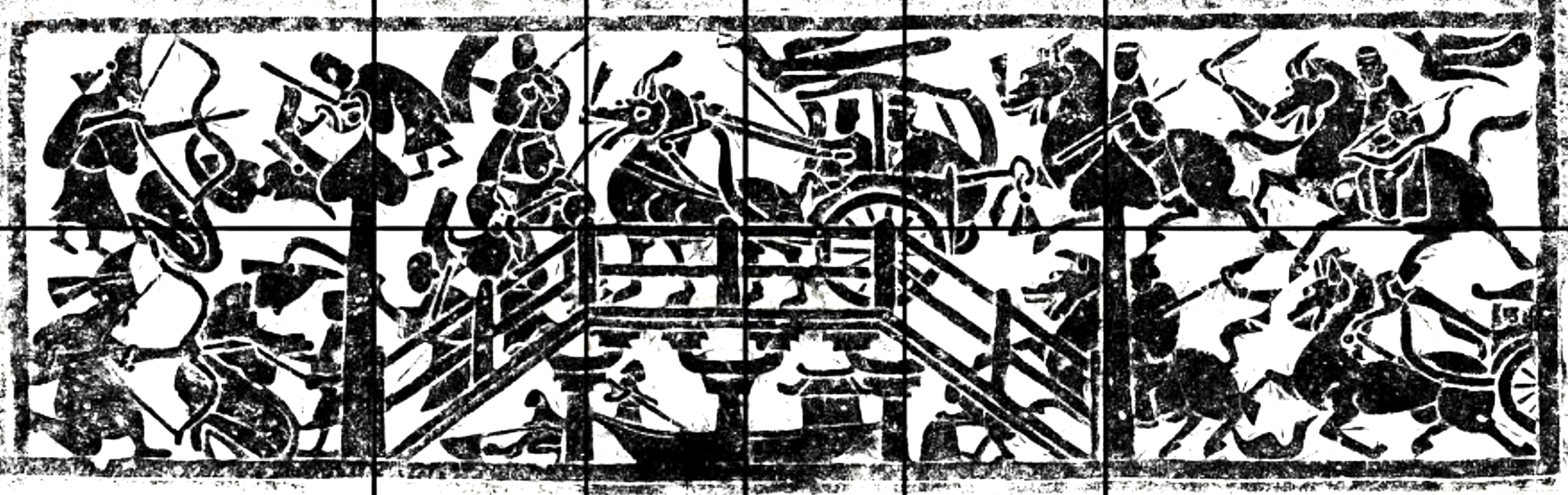
Eastern Han tombs in Shandong often have depiction of battles between Hu barbarians, with bows and arrows and wearing pointed hats (left), against Han troops. Eastern Han dynasty (151–153 CE). Tsangshan Han tomb in Linyi city, Shandong. Also visible in Yinan tombs.

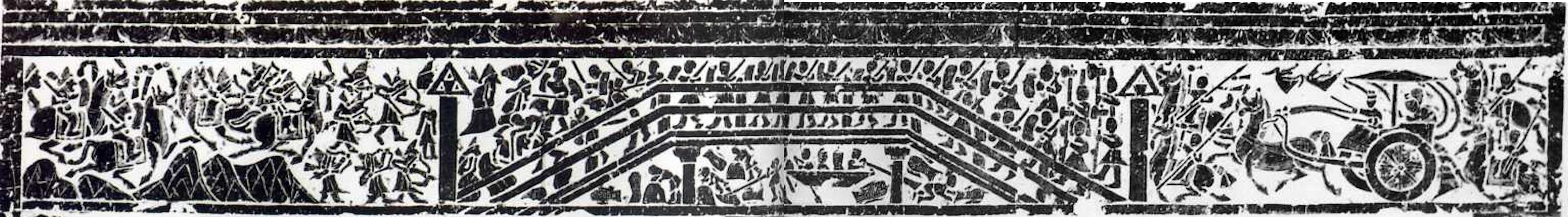
Hu warriors from the mountains (left) and Han troops (right) battling around a bridge, Yinan tombs, Shandong, 2nd century CE.

The peoples categorized as the Five Barbarians, or "Five Hu", were the Xiongnu, Jie, Xianbei, Di, and Qiang. Of these five ethnic groups, the Xiongnu and Xianbei were nomadic peoples from the northern steppes. The ethnic identity of the Xiongnu is uncertain, but the Xianbei appear to have been Mongolic. The Jie, another pastoral people, may have been a branch of the Xiongnu, who may have been Yeniseian or Indo-Scythian. The Di and Qiang were from the highlands of western China. The Qiang were predominantly herdsmen and spoke Sino-Tibetan (Tibeto-Burman) languages, while the Di were farmers who may have spoken a Sino-Tibetan or Turkic language. The traditional explanation, going back to the second-century Han dynasty scholar Cui Hao 崔浩 is that the Donghu were originally located "east of the Xiongnu" who were one of the "Five Barbarians" (Hú). Modern Chinese apologetics suggests that "Donghu" was a transcription of an endonym and did not literally mean "Eastern Barbarian".

The usual English translation of Dōnghú is "Eastern Barbarians" (e.g., Watson, di Cosmo, Pulleyblank, and Yu), and the partial translation "Eastern Hu" is occasionally used (Pulleyblank). Note that "Eastern Barbarians" is also a translation for Dōngyì 東夷, which refers to "ancient peoples in eastern China, Korea, Japan, etc."

Chinese Sinocentrism differentiates the Huáxià 華夏 "Chinese" and the Yì 夷 "barbarians, non-Chinese, foreigner": this is referred to as the Huá–Yì distinction. Many names besides Hu originally had pejorative "barbarian" meanings, for instance Nanman 南蠻 ("southern barbarians") and Beidi 北狄 ("northern barbarians"). Edwin G. Pulleyblank explains:

At the dawn of history we find the Chinese, self-identified by such terms as Hsia and Hua, surrounded and interspersed by other peoples with whom they were frequently in conflict and whom they typically looked down upon as inferior beings in the same way the Hellenes looked down on the barbaroi and, indeed, as human we-groups have always looked down on their neighbors.

The historian Nicola di Cosmo concludes:

We can thus reasonably say that, by the end of the fourth century B.C., the term "Hu" applied to various ethnic groups (tribes, groups of tribes, and even states) speaking different languages and generally found living scattered across a wide territory. Their fragmentation, however, could be turned, when the need arose, into a superior form of political organization (a "state"). This explains why hu appears often preceded by a qualifier that we may take for a specific ethnic group, as with the Lin Hu and the Tung Hu. Whether or not it had originally been an ethnonym, such a designation had been lost by the Warring States period.

In modern Standard Chinese usage hú has lost its original meaning although it still appears in words like èrhú 二胡 (lit. "two foreign") "Chinese two-string fiddle", hútáo 胡桃 ("foreign peach") "walnut", and húluóbō 胡萝卜 ("foreign radish") "carrot".

=== Etymology ===
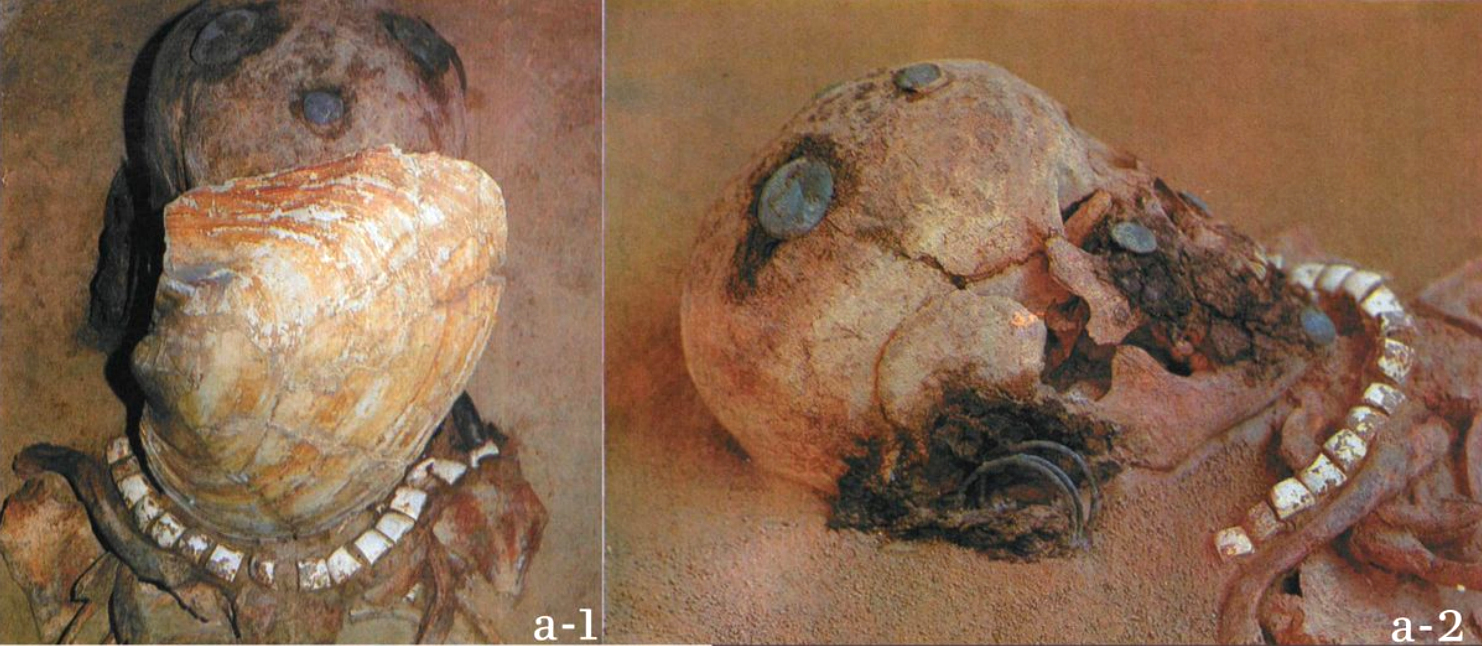
Burial at Zhoujiadi cemetery (with and without mussel mask), an ancestor of the Donghu clan, Upper Xiajiadian culture (1000–600 BCE).

The modern pronunciation Dōnghú differs from the Old Chinese pronunciation, which roughly dates from the Warring States period (476–221 BCE) when Donghu was first recorded. Old Chinese reconstructions of Dōnghú include *Tûngɣâg, *Tungg'o, *Tewnggaɣ, *Tongga, and *Tôŋgâ > *Toŋgɑ. William H. Baxter and Laurent Sagart (2014) reconstruct the Old Chinese ancestor of 胡 Hú as *[g]ˤa. Recently, Christopher Atwood reconstructs a foreign ethnonym *ga, which was borrowed into Old Chinese as 胡 *gâ (> hú), while an i-suffixed derivative of *ga underlies two Middle Chinese transcriptions: namely,

- *Bo-lâk Khėi (> Bùluò-Jī) (步落稽), based on the ethnonym of a people of Xiongnu, Mountain Rong or Red Di origins in Northern Shaanxi-Shanxi-Ordos; as well as
- *Gʰiei, based on the ethnonym of the Mongolic-speaking Xī (奚), whom Arab geographers knew as Qāy.

The etymology of ethnonym *ga (> 胡 Old Chinese *gâ > Chinese hú) is unknown.

As for Qay, Golden (2003 & 2006) proposes several Mongolic etymologies: ɣai "trouble, misfortune, misery", χai "interjection of grief", χai "to seek", χai "to hew", albeit none compelling.

Some dictionaries and scholars (e.g. Jean-Pierre Abel-Rémusat) confuse Dōnghú 東胡 with Tungusic peoples, Tonggu 通古. Russian Mongolist Lydia Viktorova states that:

This is due to the insufficient amount of materials and partly due to the mistakes made. For example, the phonetic identification of the ancient people of the Donghu (Eastern Hu) with the Tungus, made at the beginning of the 19th century by Abel-Rémusat only on the principle of sound similarity between Donghu and Tungus. This led to the fact that for a long time all the descendants of the Donghu were considered the ancestors of the Tungus."

This "chance similarity in modern pronunciation", writes Pulleyblank, "led to the once widely held assumption that the Eastern Hu were Tungusic in language. This is a vulgar error with no real foundation."

== History ==
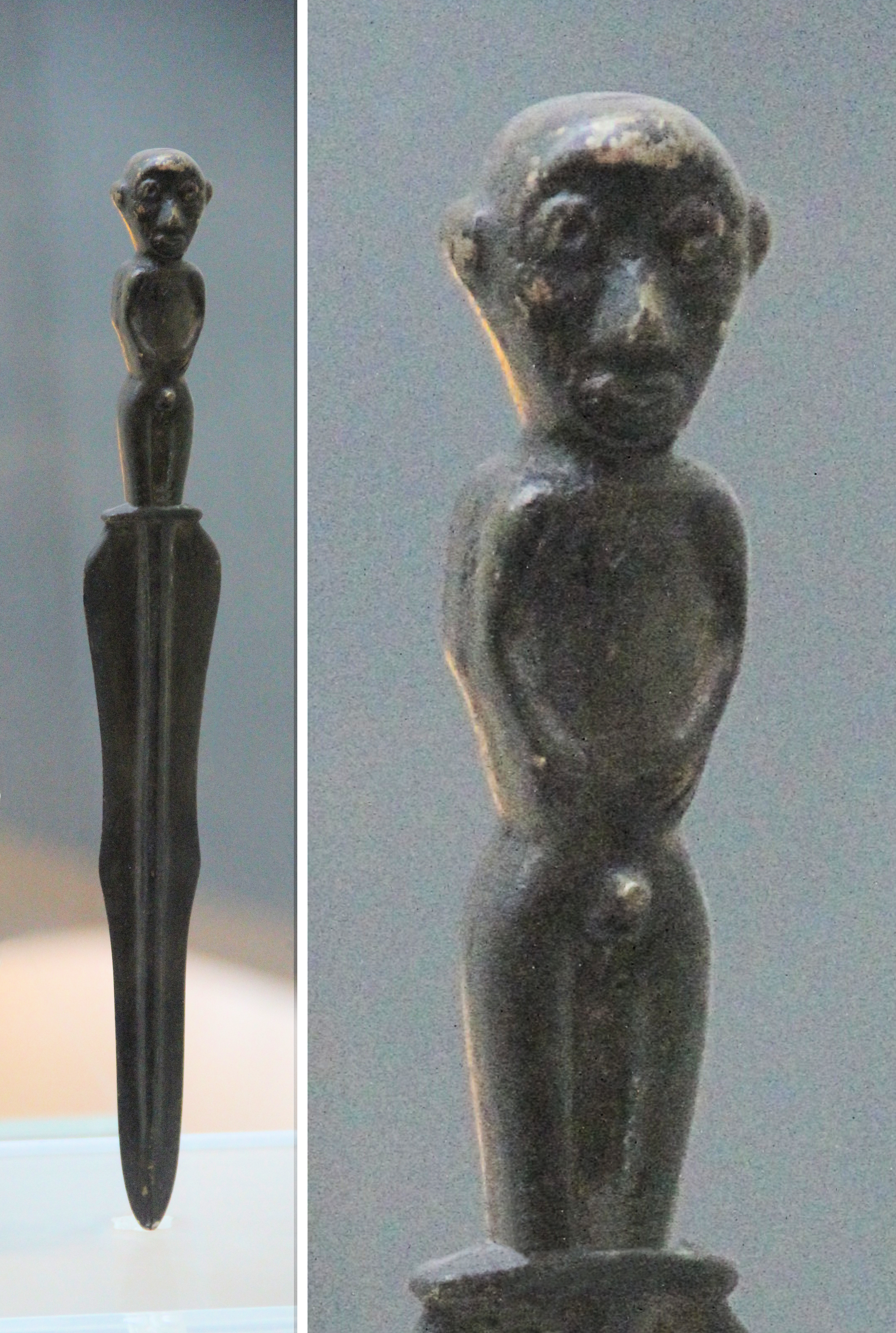
Bronze Dagger with figurine, Upper Xiajiadian culture (1000–600 BCE). Inner Mongolia Museum.

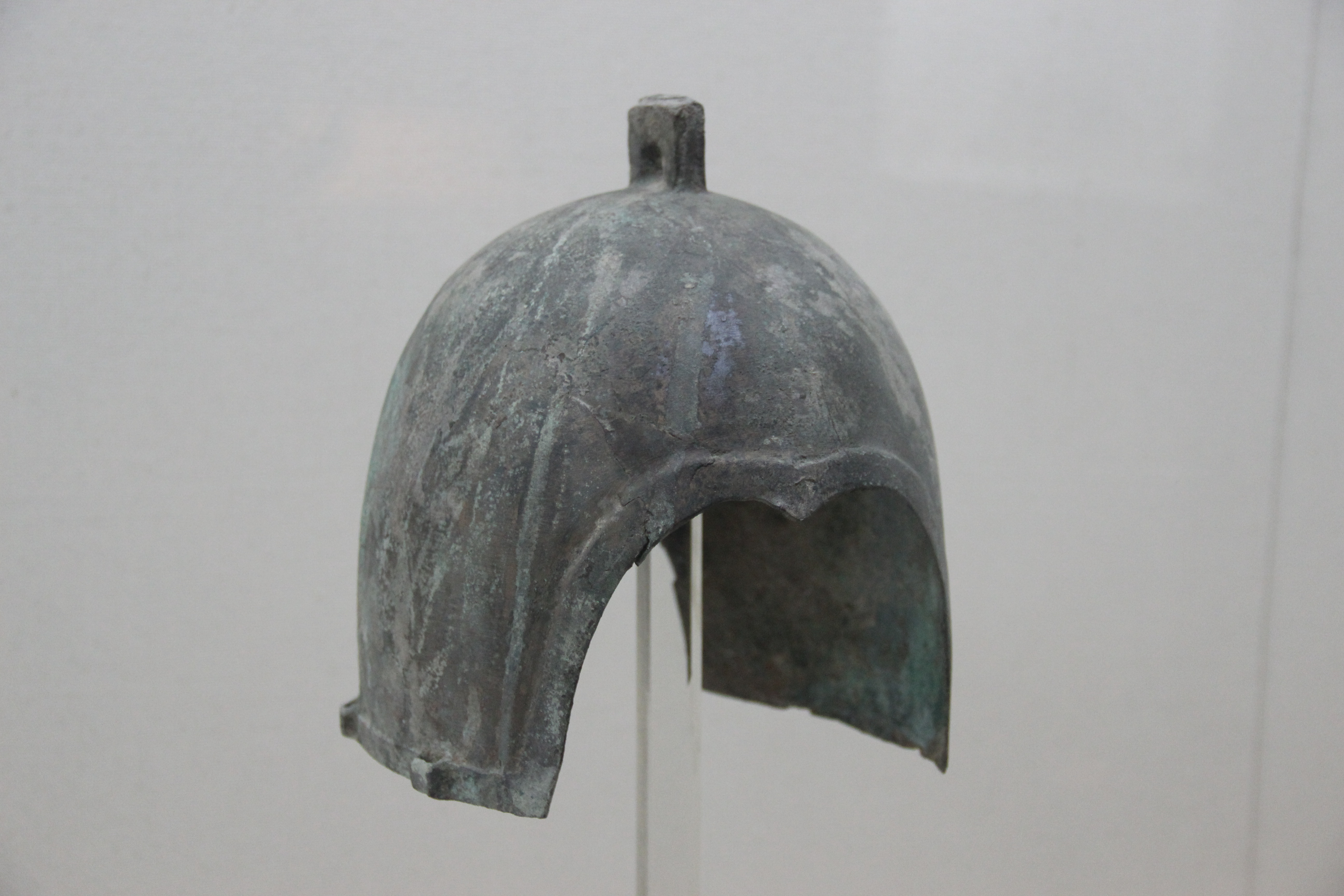
Bronze helmet, Upper Xiajiadian Culture later period.

Among the northern ethnic groups, the Donghu were the earliest to become a civilization and the first to develop bronze technology. Their culture was associated with the Upper Xiajiadian culture, characterized by the practice of agriculture and animal husbandry supplemented by handicrafts and bronze art. Through the use of cavalry and bronze weaponry in warfare, the Donghu apparently dominated over the Xiongnu to their west. Although "Upper Xiajiadian" is indeed frequently attributed to the Donghu, such attribution remains uncertain given the lack of details in Chinese sources about what the Donghu were, beyond a name (Donghu, Eastern Hu, ie "Eastern mounted nomads") and the account of their destruction by the Xiongnu.

The Shiji section on Xiongnu history first records the Donghu during the era of Duke Wen of Jin (r. 697–628 BCE) and Duke Mu of Qin (r. c. 659–621 BCE).

At this time Qin and Jin were the most powerful states in China. Duke Wen of Jin expelled the Di barbarians and drove them into the region west of the Yellow River between the Yun and Luo rivers; there they were known as the Red Di and the White Di. Shortly afterwards, Duke Mu of Qin, having obtained the services of You Yu, succeeded in getting the eight barbarian tribes of the west to submit to his authority.
Thus at this time there lived in the region west of Long the Mianzhu, the Hunrong, and the Diyuan tribes. North of Mts. Qi and Liang and the Jing and Qi rivers lived the Yiqu, Dali, Wuzhi, and Quyuan tribes. North of Jin were the Linhu (Forest Barbarians) and the Loufan, while north of Yan lived the Donghu (Eastern Barbarians) and Shanrong (Mountain Barbarians), each of them with their own chieftains. From time to time they would have gatherings of a hundred or so men, but no one tribe was capable of unifying the others under a single rule.

In 307 BCE King Wuling of Zhao, instituted a military reform called "Hu clothes, Cavalry archery" after having been repeatedly harassed earlier in his reign by Donghu horse-archers. In 300 BCE Qin Kai, a general taken hostage from the state of Yan (whose capital "Ji" is now Beijing), defeated the Donghu after having gained the esteem of the Donghu and learning their battle tactics. In 273 BCE during the reign of King Huiwen, Zhao defeated the Donghu. In 265 BCE Li Mu of the Zhao state, one of the four most prominent generals of the Warring States period, defeated the Donghu after stopping a major Xiongnu invasion. By the time of the rule of the Xiongnu chanyu Touman (c. 220 BCE to 209 BCE), "the Donghu were very powerful and the Yuezhi were likewise flourishing." When the Xiongnu crown prince Modu Chanyu killed his father Touman in 209 BCE and took the title of chanyu, the Donghu thought that Modu feared them, and they started to ask for tribute from the Xiongnu that included his best horses and even a consort of Modu's. Modu conceded. Not satisfied with this they asked for some of the Xiongnu territories. This enraged Modu attacked and defeated them, killing their ruler, taking his subjects prisoner, and seizing their livestock, before turning west to attack and defeat the Yuezhi. This caused disintegration in the Donghu federation. Thereafter, the Wuhuan (southern Donghu) moved to Mount Wuhuan and engaged in continuous warfare with the Xiongnu on the west and China on the south. As they became worn out from the lengthy battles, the Xianbei (northern Donghu) moved northward to Mount Xianbei to preserve their strength. When the Han dynasty vassal king Lu Wan defected to the Xiongnu in 195 BCE he was made King of Donghu (東胡王) by the Xiongnu. This Kingdom of Donghu fiefdom lasted until 144 BCE when Lu Wan's grandson Lu Tazhi defected back to the Han dynasty. The Wuhuan inhabitants of the fiefdom continued as vassals of the Xiongnu until 121 BCE. Gradually the name Donghu stopped being used. In the 1st century, the Xianbei defeated the Wuhuan and northern Xiongnu, and developed into a powerful state under the leadership of their elected Khan, Tanshihuai.

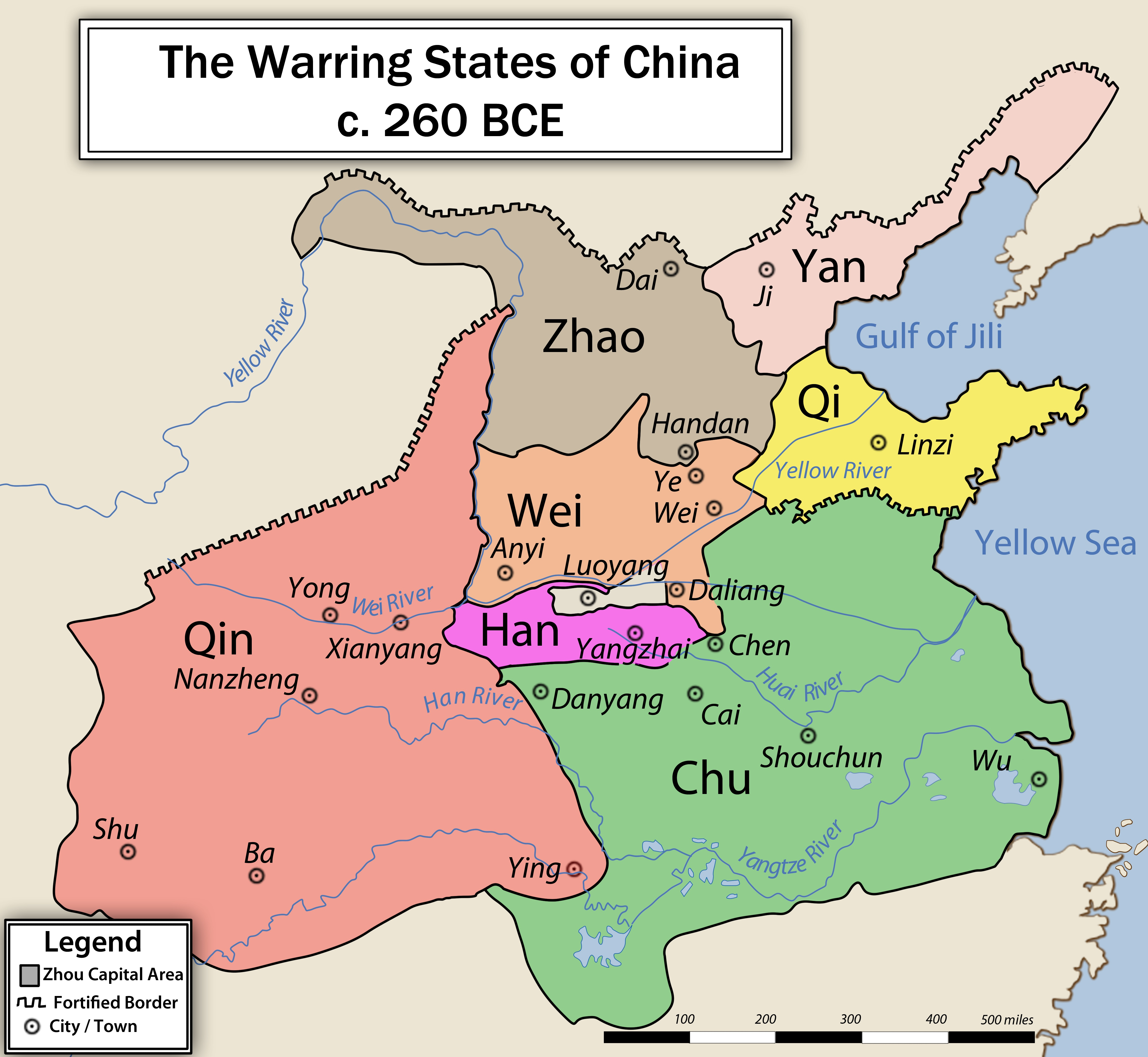
Donghu raided both Zhao and Yan in the 4th and 3rd centuries BCE

The Book of Jin, published in 648, linked the Donghu and their Xianbei descendants to the Youxiong lineage (有熊氏), associated with the Yellow Emperor and possibly named after the Yellow Emperor's "hereditary principality". However, many non-Han Chinese rulers were claimed to be the Yellow Emperor's descendants, for individual and national prestige.

Chinese historian Yu Ying-shih describes the Donghu.

The Tung-hu peoples were probably a tribal federation founded by a number of nomadic peoples, including the Wu-huan and Hsien-pi. After its conquest of the Hsiung-nu, the federation apparently ceased to exist. Throughout the Han period, no trace can be found of activities of the Tung-hu as a political entity.

Di Cosmo says the Chinese considered the Hu as "a new type of foreigner", and believes, "This term, whatever its origin, soon came to indicate an 'anthropological type' rather than a specific group or tribe, which the records allow us to identify as early steppe nomads. The Hu were the source of the introduction of cavalry in China."

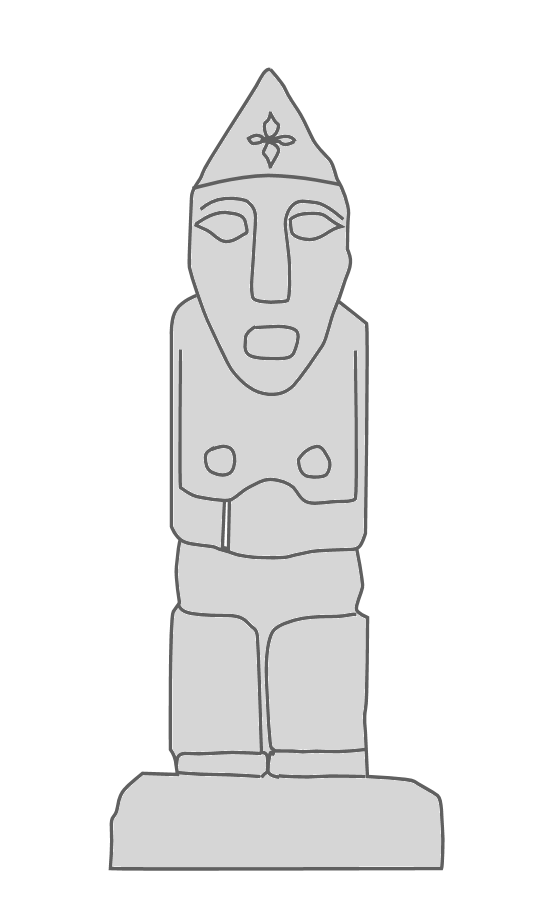
General appearance of the numerous Scythoïd Hu monumental statues from Shandong, featuring people with a high nose, deep eyes and a pointed hat. Eastern Han period, 2nd century CE.

Pulleyblank cites Paul Pelliot that the Donghu, Xianbei, and Wuhuan were "proto-Mongols".

The Eastern Hu, mentioned in the Shih-chi along with the Woods Hu and the Lou-fan as barbarians to the north of Chao in the fourth century B.C., appear again as one of the first peoples whom the Hsiung-nu conquered in establishing their empire. Toward the end of the Former Han, as the Hsiung-nu empire was weakening through internal dissension, the Eastern Hu became rebellious. From then on they played an increasingly prominent role in Chinese frontier strategy as a force to play off against the Hsiung-nu. Two major divisions are distinguished, the Hsien-pei to the north and the Wu-huan to the south. By the end of the first century B.C. these more specific names had supplanted the older generic term.

Pulleyblank also writes that although

there is now archaeological evidence of the spread of pastoral nomadism based on horse riding from Central Asia into Mongolia and farther east in the first half of the first millennium BCE, as far as we have evidence it did not impinge on Chinese consciousness until the northward push of the state of Zhao 趙 to the edge of the steppe in present Shanxi province shortly before the end of the fifth century B.C.E. brought them into contact with a new type of horse-riding “barbarian” that they called Hu 胡. … In Han times the term Hu was applied to steppe nomads in general but especially to the Xiongnu who had become the dominant power in the steppe. Earlier it had referred to a specific proto-Mongolian people, now differentiated as the Eastern Hu 東胡, from whom the Xianbei 鮮卑 and the Wuhuan 烏桓 later emerged.

== Legacy ==
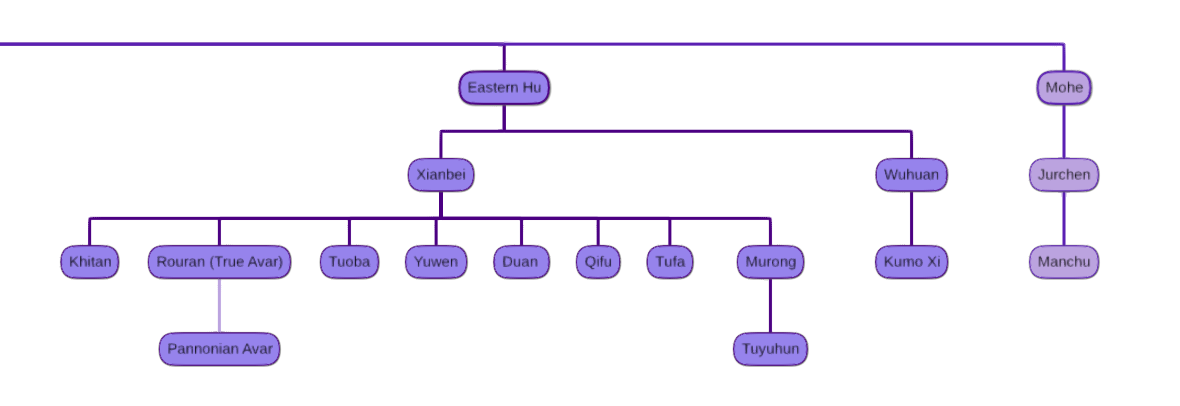
Lineage of the Donghu (Eastern Hu)

The Donghu later divided into the Wuhuan in the Yan Mountains and the Xianbei in the Greater Khingan Range: the Wuhuan were ancestors of the Kumo Xi, while the Xianbei were ancestors of the Khitan and the Mongols. Another people of Donghu descent were the Rouran (Proto-Mongolic tribe).

In the past, scholars such as Fan Zuoguai and Han Feimu mistakenly thought that Jurchens (ancestors of the Manchus) descended from the Donghu. In 1980, Russian scholar Lydia Leonidovna Viktorova criticized the 19th century phonetic identification of the ancient people of the Donghu (Eastern Hu) with the Tungus.

A genetic study published in the American Journal of Physical Anthropology detected the paternal haplogroup C2b1a1b among the Xianbei and Rouran. This lineage has also been found among the Donghu. Haplogroup C2b1a1b has a high frequency among Mongols.

== Ethnic origins ==
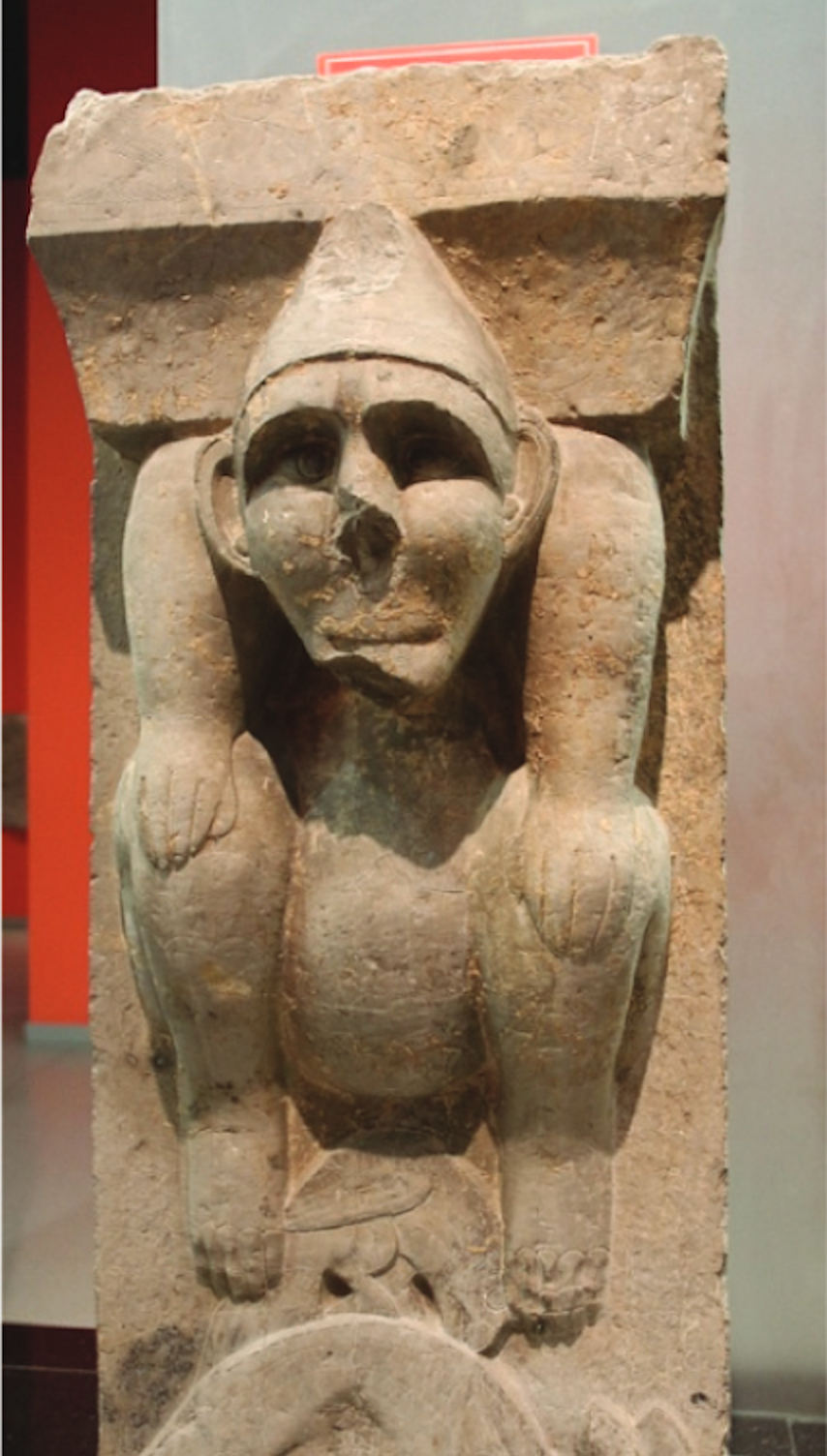
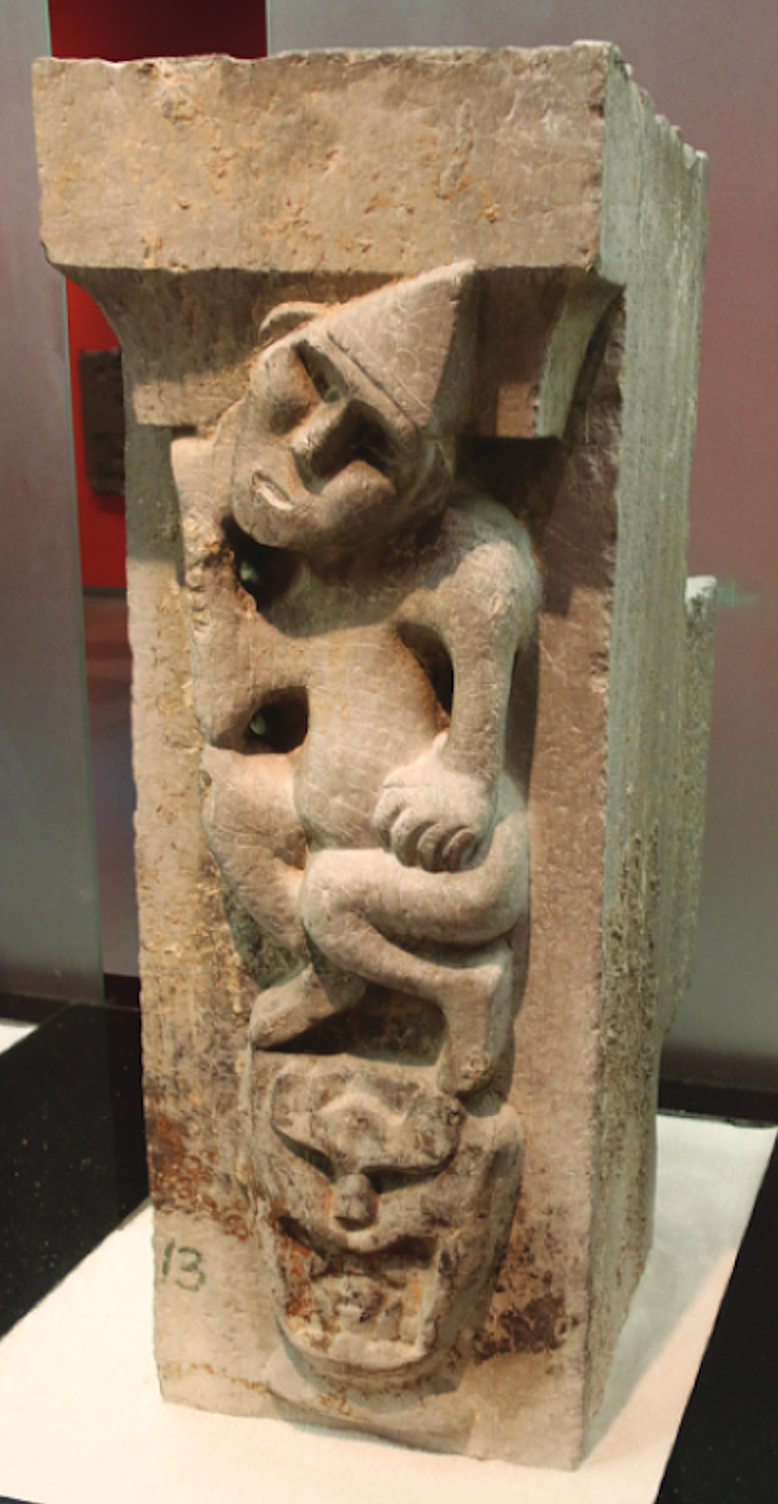
Hu statues from Wu Baizhuang tomb (吳白莊), Late Eastern Han period, Linyi, Shandong.

The ethnic composition of the Donghu people remains unclear. It is suggested that the majority was of Mongolic and Tungusic origins, and that they stood in contact with other Steppe nomadic entities, such as the Xiongnu and the Saka people further West. The Donghu were ethnically related to the Xianbei, Jinggouzi and Rouran, which are described as either Proto-Mongols or Para-Mongols.

While often being referred as tribal confederation, they may rather be an only loosely united group of nomadic tribes "that occupied territories between the Mongolian steppes and the Great Xing'an Mountains of China".

=== Genetics ===
A genetic study published in the American Journal of Physical Anthropology in August 2018 detected the paternal haplogroup C2b1a1b among the Xianbei and Rouran. This lineage has also been found among remains associated with the Donghu people. The authors of the study suggested that haplogroup C2b1a1b was an important lineage among the Donghu, and that the Rouran were paternally descended from the Xianbei and Donghu. Haplogroup C2b1a1b has a high frequency among Mongols.

Genetic data support a close genetic relationship between the Donghu, the ancient Jinggouzi people, and the Xianbei. The closest modern extant people to the historical Donghu are the Oroqen people of Northern China.

== See also ==
- Tangut
- Lu Wan
- Qin Kai

== Sources ==
- Baxter, William H. (1992). A Handbook of Old Chinese Phonology. Mouton de Gruyter.
- DeFrancis, John, (2003). ABC Chinese-English Comprehensive Dictionary. University of Hawaii Press.
- Di Cosmo, Nicola. (1999). "The Northern Frontier in Pre-imperial China", in Cambridge History of Ancient China, Cambridge University Press, pp. 885–966.
- Di Cosmo, Nicola. (2002). Ancient China and its Enemies: The Rise of Nomadic Power in East Asian History. Cambridge University Press. ISBN 0-521-77064-5 (hbk); ISBN 0-521-54382-7 (pbk).
- Dong, Tonghe [董同龢]. (1948). "Shanggu yinyun biao gao 上古音韻表搞", Bulletin of the Institute of History and Philology, Academia Sinica 18:1–249. (in Chinese)
- Hao, Weimin [郝维民] and Qimudedaoerji [齐木德道尔吉]. (2007). Neimenggu tong shi gang yao [Outline of Comprehensive History of Inner Mongolia] 内蒙古通史纲要. Beijing [北京], Renmin chubanshe [People's Press] 人民出版社.
- Hill, John. 2009. Through the Jade Gate to Rome: A Study of the Silk Routes during the Later Han Dynasty, First to Second Centuries CE. BookSurge. ISBN 978-1-4392-2134-1.
- Janhunen, Juha (2003). The Mongolic Languages. Routledge.
- Janhunen, Juha (27 January 2006). The Mongolic Languages. Routledge. ISBN 978-1-135-79690-7.
- Karlgren, Bernhard. (1957). Grammata Serica Recensa. Museum of Far Eastern Antiquities.
- Lebedynsky, Iaroslav. (2007). Les nomades. Editions Errance, Paris. ISBN 978-2-87772-346-6
- Li, Jiawei; et al. (August 2018). "The genome of an ancient Rouran individual reveals an important paternal lineage in the Donghu population". American Journal of Physical Anthropology. 166 (4). American Association of Physical Anthropologists: 895–905. doi:10.1002/ajpa.23491. PMID 29681138.
- Liang Shih-Chiu (1992). Far East Chinese-English Dictionary. Far East Book Co.
- Lin, Gan [林干]. (2007). Donghu shi [A History of the Donghu] 东胡史. Huhehaote [呼和浩特], Nei Menggu renmin chubanshe [Inner Mongolia People's Publishing House] 内蒙古人民出版社.
- Liu, Xueyao [劉學銚] (1994). Xianbei shi lun [the Xianbei History] 鮮卑史論. Taipei [台北], Nantian shuju [Nantian Press] 南天書局.
- Lü, Jianfu [呂建福]. (2002). Tu zu shi [The Tu History] 土族史. Beijing [北京], Zhongguo shehui kexue chubanshe [Chinese Social Sciences Press] 中囯社会科学出版社.
- Ma, Changshou [馬長壽]. (1962). Wuhuan yu Xianbei [Wuhuan and Xianbei] 烏桓與鮮卑. Shanghai [上海], Shanghai renmin chubanshe [Shanghai People's Press] 上海人民出版社.
- Pulleyblank, Edwin G. (1994). “Ji Hu 稽胡: Indigenous Inhabitants of Shaanbei and Western Shanxi,” in Edward H. Kaplan, ed., Opuscula Altaica: Essays presented in honor of Henry Schwarz. ed. by. Bellingham: Western Washington University. pp. 518–519 of 499–531
- Pulleyblank, Edwin G. (1983). "The Chinese and Their Neighbors in Prehistoric and Early Historic China," in The Origins of Chinese Civilization, University of California Press, pp. 411–466.
- Pulleyblank, Edwin G. (2000). "Ji 姬 and Jiang 姜: The Role of Exogamic Clans in the Organization of the Zhou Polity", Early China 25:1–27.
- Schuessler, Axel. (2007). An Etymological Dictionary of Old Chinese. University of Hawaii Press.
- Wang, Zhongluo [王仲荦] (2007). Wei jin nan bei chao shi [History of Wei, Jin, Southern and Northern Dynasties] 魏晋南北朝史. Beijing [北京], Zhonghua shuju [China Press] 中华书局.
- Xu, Elina-Qian (2005). Historical development of the pre-dynastic Khitan (PhD). University of Helsinki.
- Watson, Burton. (1993). Records of the Grand Historian by Sima Qian. Translated by Burton Watson. Revised Edition. Columbia University Press. ISBN 0-231-08167-7.
- Yu Ying-Shih. (1986). "Han Foreign Relations," in The Cambridge History of China. 1. The Ch'in and Han Empires, Cambridge University Press, pp. 377–462.
- Zhou Fagao [周法高]. (1972). "Shanggu Hanyu he Han-Zangyu 上古漢語和漢藏語", Journal of the Institute of Chinese Studies of the Chinese University of Hong Kong 5:159–244. (in Chinese)
- Wang, Haijung; et al. (August 2012). "Genetic data suggests that the Jinggouzi people are associated with the Donghu, an ancient nomadic group of North China". Human Genetics. 84 (4). Springer: 365–378. doi:10.3378/027.084.0402. PMID 23249313. S2CID 202599607.
