= Jinggouzi culture =

Bronze Age culture of East Asia

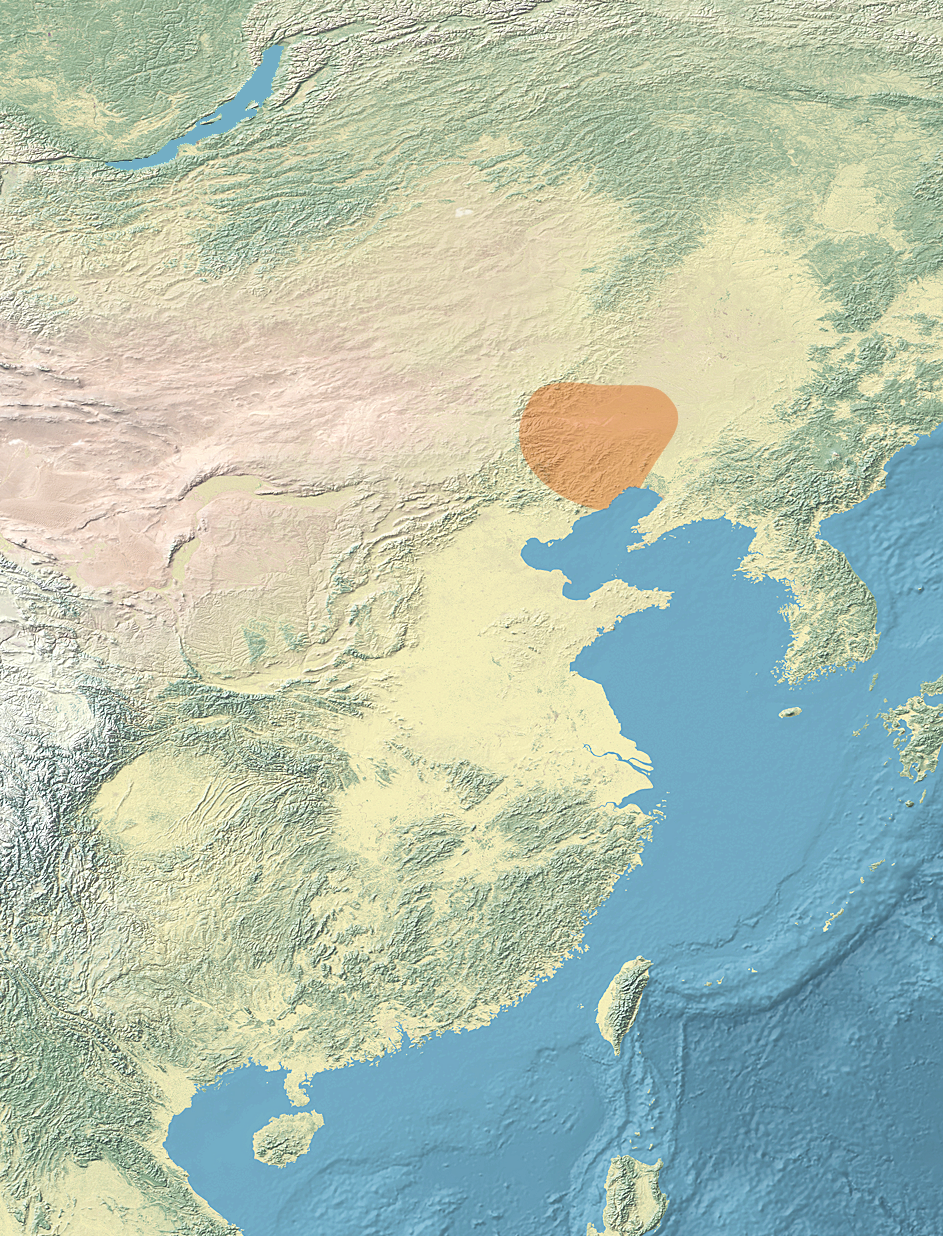
- Geographical range: Inner Mongolia
- Period: Bronze Age
- Dates: c.500 – c.150 BCE
- Preceded by: Upper Xiajiadian culture
- Followed by: Yan Kingdom (Han dynasty)

The Jinggouzi culture (Chinese: 井沟子文化; pinyin: Jǐnggōuzi wénhuà) was a culture of Inner Mongolia, particularly around Linxi County and the Greater Chifeng area, from 475 BCE to 300 BCE. It succeeded the Upper Xiajiadian culture, and preceded the establishment of the Yan territory by the Han dynasty.

Ancient samples of the Jinggouzi site situated to the northwest of the Liao civilization were assigned to Haplogroup C-M217. Northern nomads from Jinggouzi might have entered the West Liao River valley, but these Jinggouzi people (closely related to Xianbei and Oroqen) were culturally and genetically distinct from the original people of the West Liao River valley, who carried the characteristic Haplogroup N-M231 lineage. The Jinggouzi people may have been associated with the Donghu.

== See also ==
- Yan (state)

== Sources ==
- Honeychurch, William (2015). Inner Asia and the Spatial Politics of Empire: Archaeology, Mobility, and Culture Contact (PDF). doi:10.1007/978-1-4939-1815-7. ISBN 978-1-4939-1814-0.
- Sun, Yan (2017). "Identity and Artifacts on the North Central and Northeastern Frontier during the Period of State Expansion in the Late Second and the Early First Millennium BCE". Ancient China and its Eurasian Neighbors: Artifacts, Identity and Death in the Frontier, 3000–700 BCE. Cambridge University Press. pp. 72–145. doi:10.1017/9781108290555.004. ISBN 978-1-108-41861-4.
- Kradin, Nikolay (24 May 2018). "Ancient Steppe Nomad Societies". Oxford Research Encyclopedia of Asian History. doi:10.1093/acrefore/9780190277727.013.3. ISBN 978-0-19-027772-7.
