= Upper Xiajiadian culture =

Bronze age archaeological culture in Northeast China

Coordinates: 42.3533°N 119.1629°E

- General location of the Upper Xiajiadian culture, and contemporary Asian polities c. 1000 BCE
- Dates: 1000–600 BCE
- Preceded by: Lower Xiajiadian culture
- Followed by: Jinggouzi culture Donghu people (700–150 BCE)

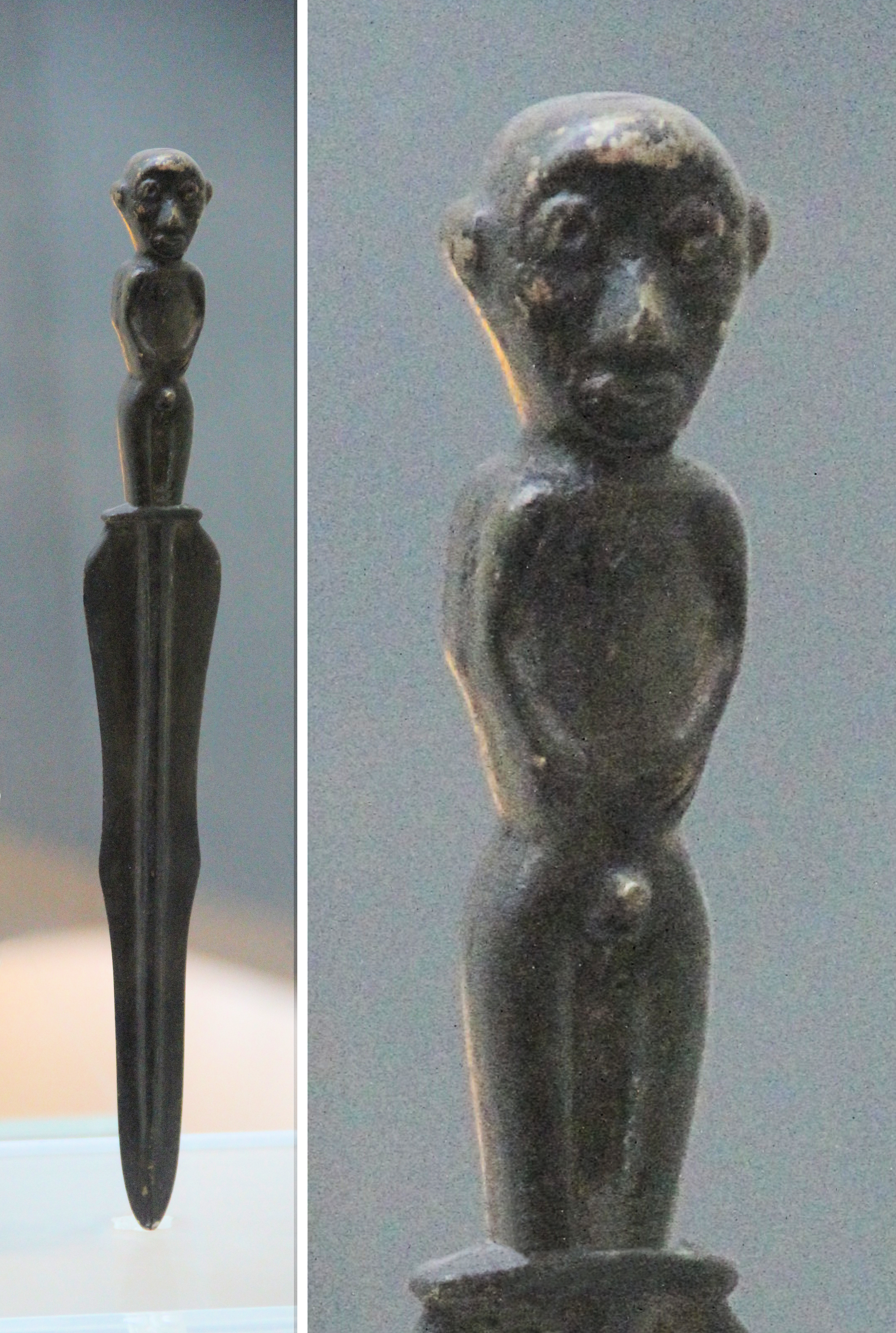
Bronze Dagger with figurine, Upper Xiajiadian.

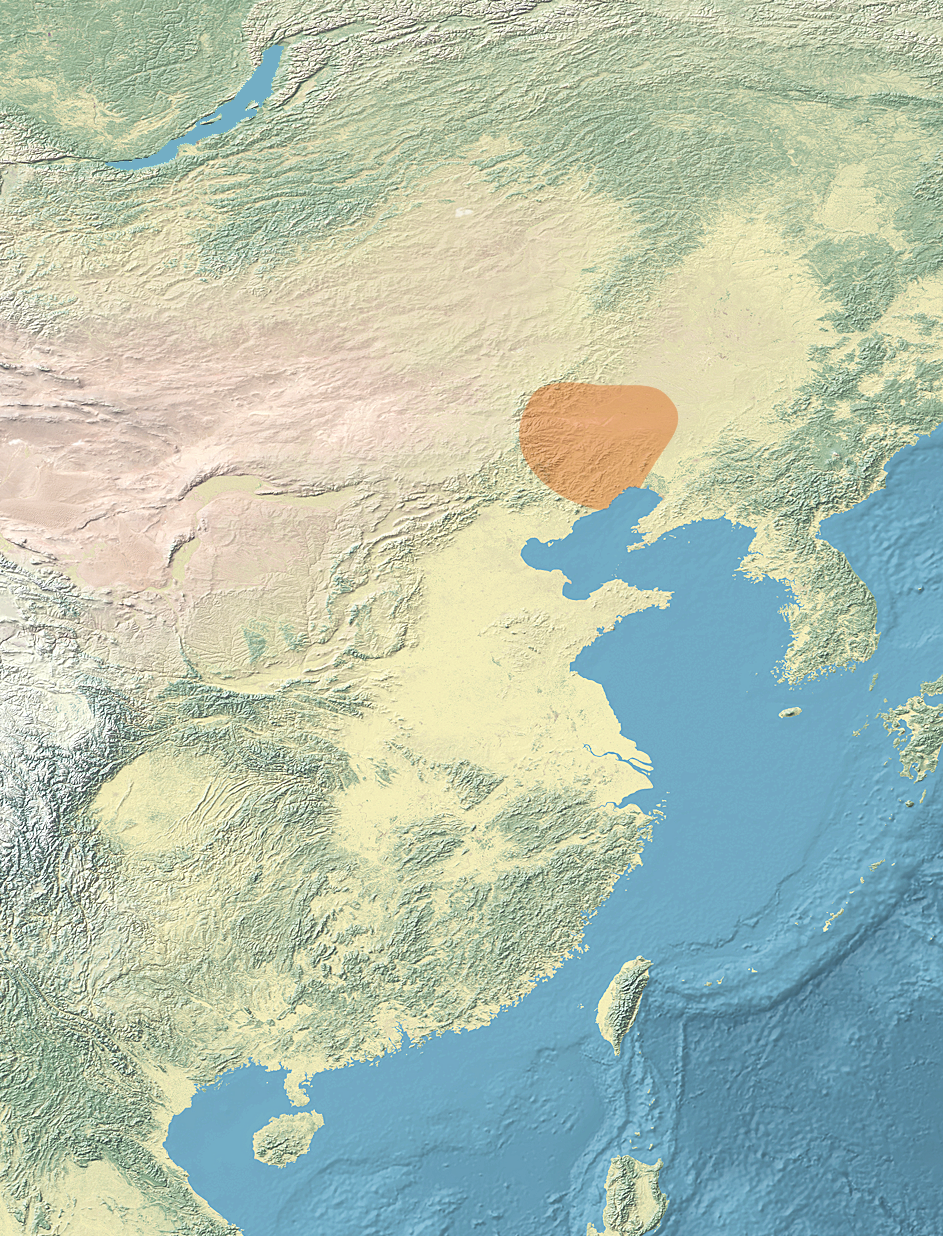
Upper Xiajiadian culture area.

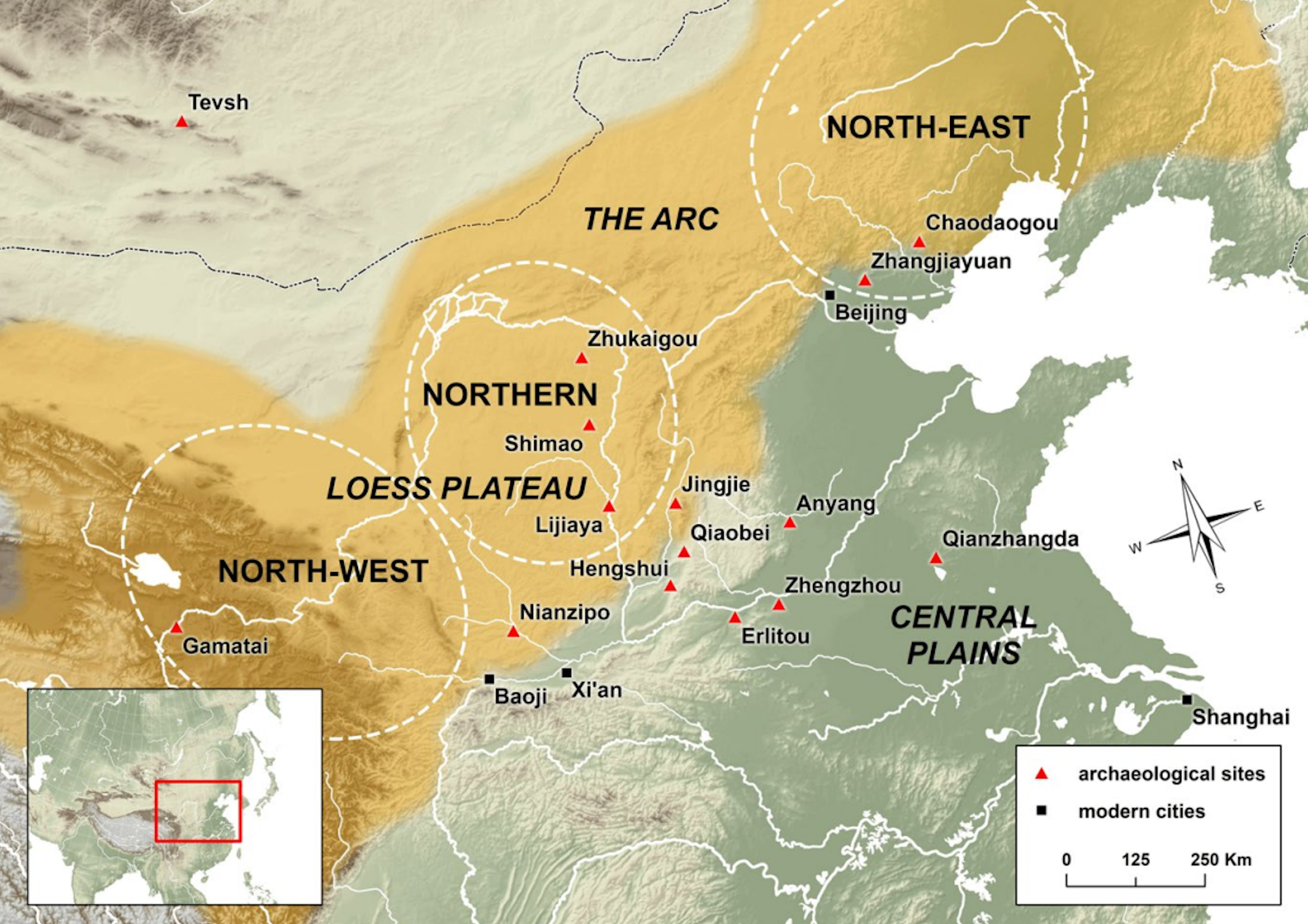
The Upper Xiajiadian culture was part of the "Arc of the eastern Steppe", next to the Central Plain of China.

The Upper Xiajiadian culture (simplified Chinese: 夏家店上层文化; traditional Chinese: 夏家店上層文化; pinyin: Xià jiā diàn shàngcéng wénhuà) (c. 1000–600 BCE) was a Bronze Age archaeological culture in Northeast China derived from the Eurasian steppe bronze tradition. It is associated with the Donghu (loosely translated as "Eastern Barbarians") of Chinese history.

== Characteristics ==
The Upper Xiajiadian culture emerged out of local Ancient Northeast Asian-derived tribes of hunter-gatherers and early farmers, which shifted to a pastoralist lifestyle.

This culture is found mainly in southeastern Inner Mongolia and western Liaoning, China. The Upper Xiajiadian's range was slightly larger than that of the Lower Xiajiadian reaching areas north of the Xilamulun River. Compared to the Lower Xiajiadian culture, population levels were lower, less dense, and more widespread. The culture still relied heavily on agriculture, but also moved toward a more pastoral, nomadic lifestyle. The social structure changed from being an acephalous or tribal society into a more chiefdom-oriented society. The type site is represented by the upper layer at Xiajiadian, Chifeng, Inner Mongolia.

The Upper Xiajiadian culture is considered as the earliest "Scythian-style" (Saka-style) culture in North China, starting the 9th century BCE. The development of animal styles may have been the result of contacts with nomads in Mongolia (Deer stones culture) in the 9th — 8th centuries BCE. It has strong similarities with other Scythoïd cultures to the west, such as the Maoqinggou culture, the Ordos culture, the Shajing culture in Gansu, and of course the Saka culture of the Xinjiang.

The Upper Xiajiadian culture produced inferior ceramic artifacts compared to those of the Lower Xiajiadian culture, although this was compensated by their superior bronze, bone, and stone artifacts. The culture is well known for its bronze objects, producing bronze daggers, axes, chisels, arrowheads, knives, and helmets. Upper Xiajiadian bronzes were decorated with animal and natural motifs, which suggest possible Saka (Scythian) affinities and indicate continued cultural contact and exchange across the Eurasian steppes.

The locally produced bronze vessels were much smaller than comparable bronzes from Zhou states. In the later periods, Zhou-style dagger-axes and bronze vessels were found at Upper Xiajiadian sites. In one case, bronze vessels belonging to the ruling family of the State of Xu were discovered in an Upper Xiajiadian grave at Xiaoheishigou (小黑石沟), evidenced by the inscriptions on one of the vessels.

Upper Xiajiadian culture shows evidence of a drastic shift in lifestyle compared to that of the Lower Xiajiadian culture. The Upper Xiajiadian culture placed less emphasis on permanent structures, preferring to reoccupy Lower Xiajiadian structures or reuse Lower Xiajiadian stones for building Upper Xiajiadian structures. The horse became important to the culture, as evidenced by the remains of horses and horse paraphernalia found at Upper Xiajiadian sites. The culture also moved away from a centralized social organization, as no evidence for large public works has been discovered at Upper Xiajiadian sites. From relying on pigs to a dependence on sheep and goats for its primary source of domesticated protein, the culture built more extravagant graves for its elites than the Lower Xiajiadian, with more numerous and elaborate burial offerings. Upper Xiajiadian burials were typically marked by cairns and tumuli.

=== Genetics ===
Genetic analyses of remains from the Upper Xiajiadian culture (UXC) are primarily of Ancient Northern East Asian origin and similar to "West Liao River farmers" (WLR_BA). The Bronze Age West Liao River farmers were found to display genetic continuity with modern Koreans. One UXC individual, however, shared higher genetic affinities to earlier "Amur hunter-gatherers", later Xianbei remains as well as contemporary Tungusic-speaking peoples, suggesting him to be a recent migrant from further North. The majority of Upper Xiajiadian remains belonged to subclades of paternal haplogroup N-M231, C-M217, and O-M175.

The genetic profile of Upper Xiajiadian individuals differed from the Lower Xiajiadian populations, who displayed high genetic affinity with Yellow River farmers associated with Sinitic peoples. The Upper Xiajiadian genome may point to migrations from the north Eurasian steppes and the Amur region during the Bronze Age period.

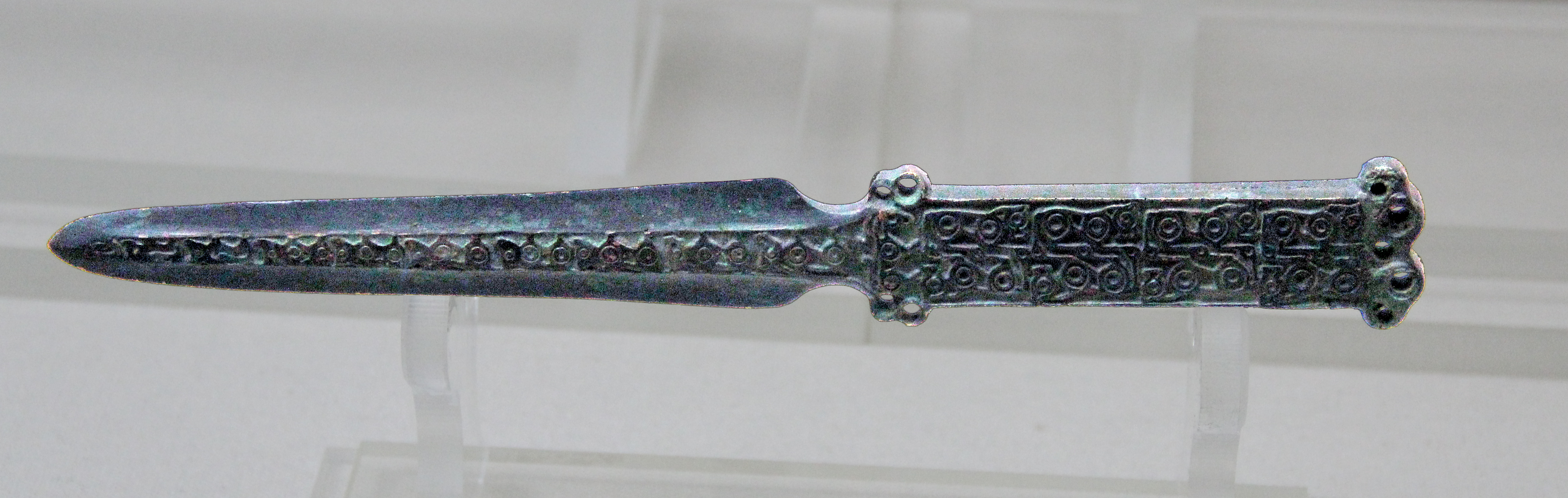
Bronze dagger with motifs of horses from the Xiaoheishigou Site, Upper Xiajiadian culture, early 8th Century BCE. Inner Mongolia Museum.

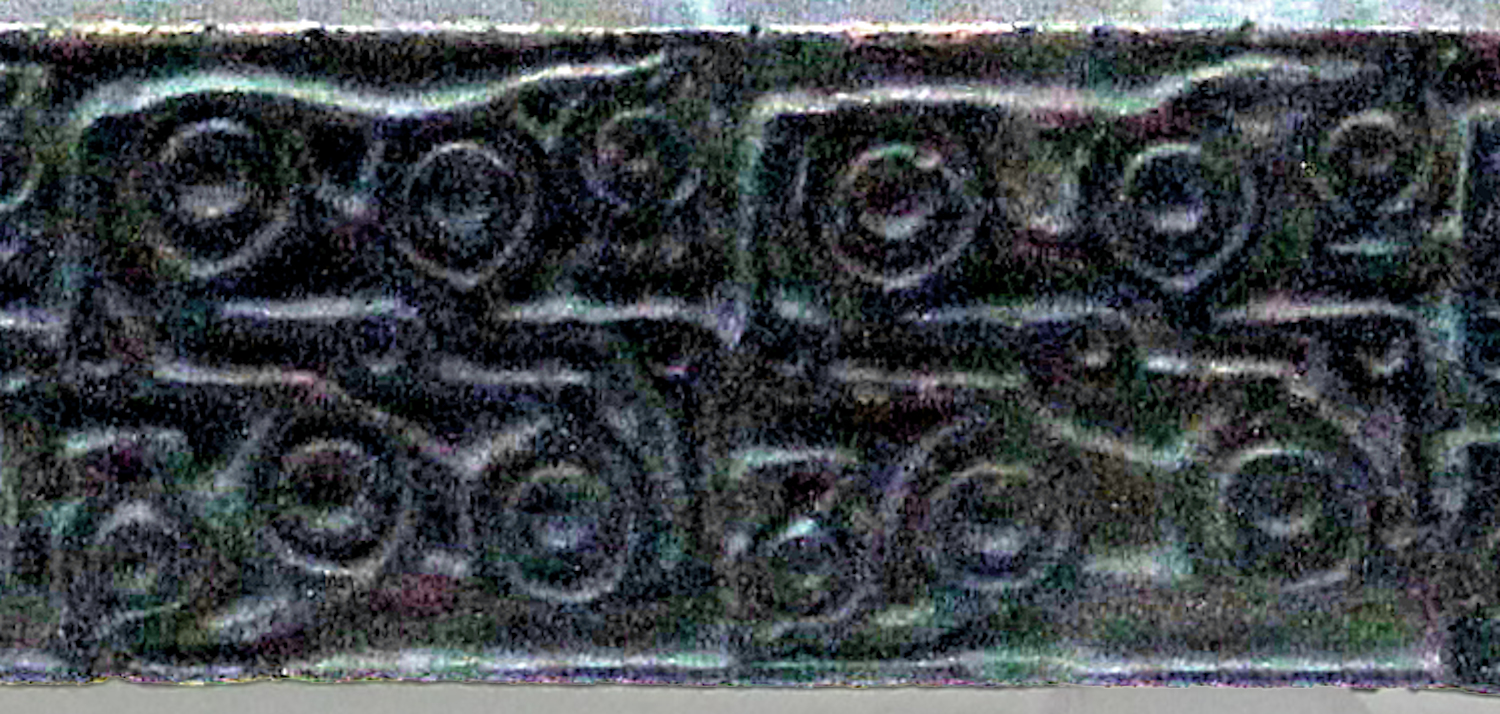
Motif of four horses in Animal style (Hilt of bronze dagger, early 8th Century BCE).

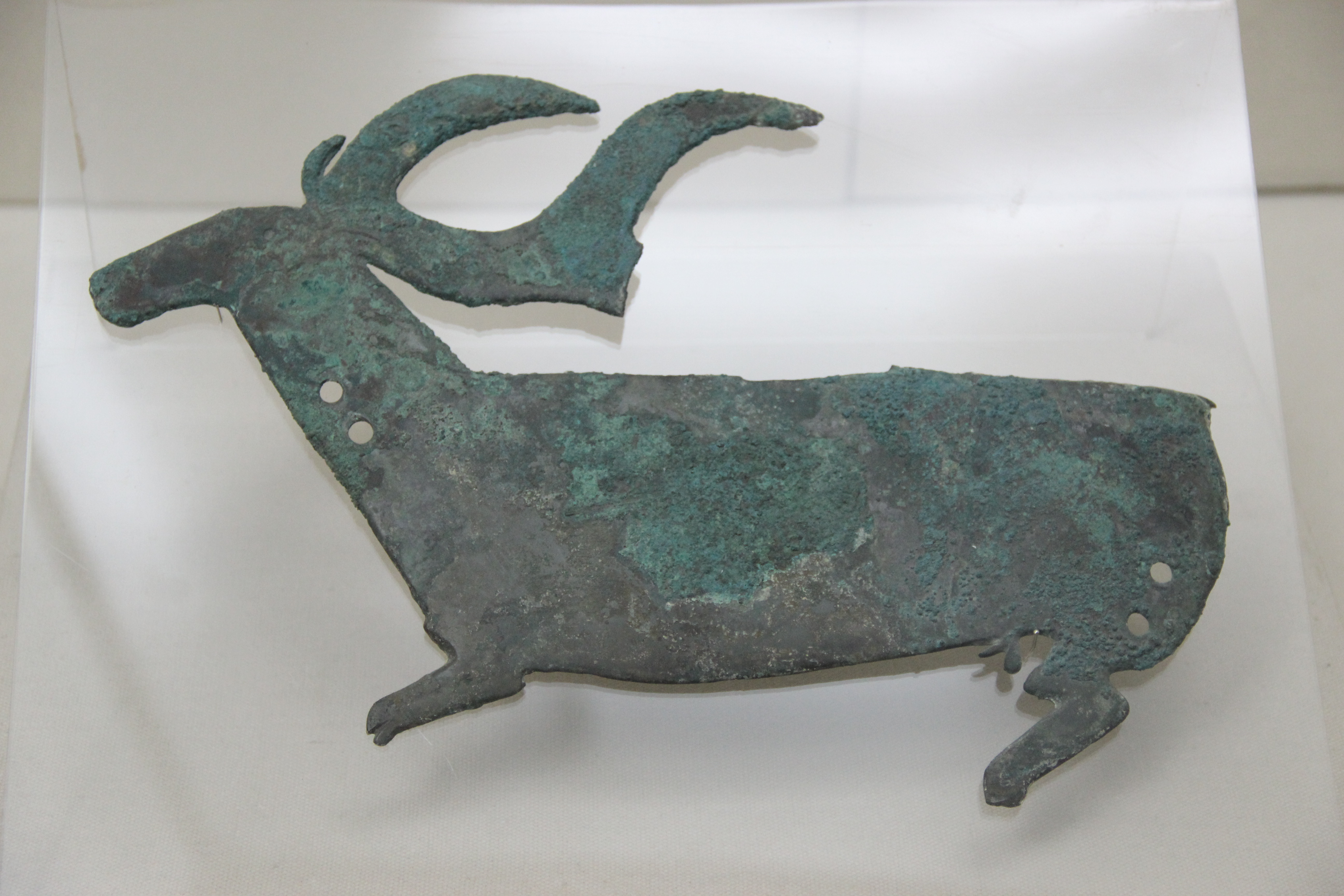
Bronze deer, Upper Xiajiadian culture.

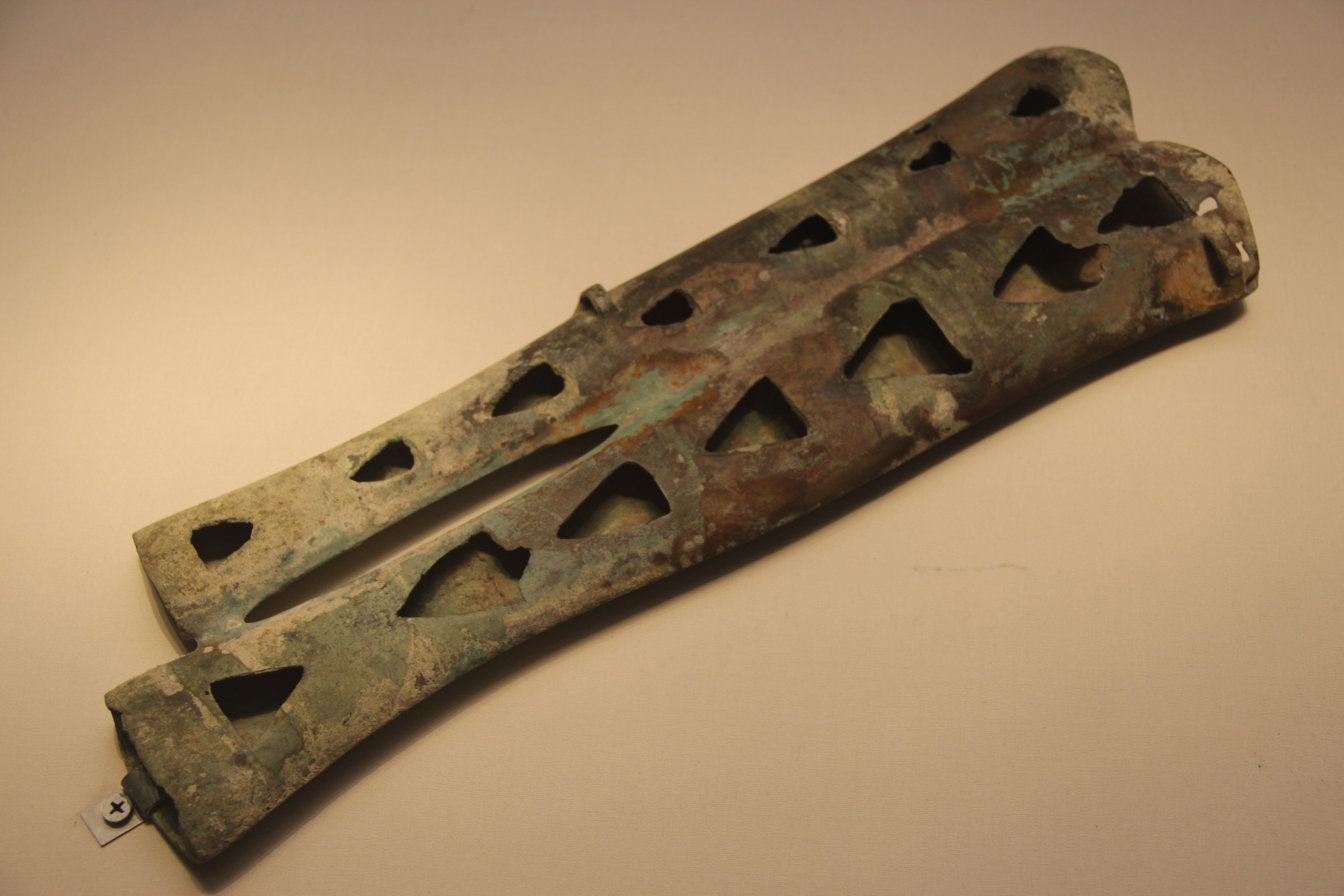
Two-swords bronze scabbard, Upper Xiajiadian culture.

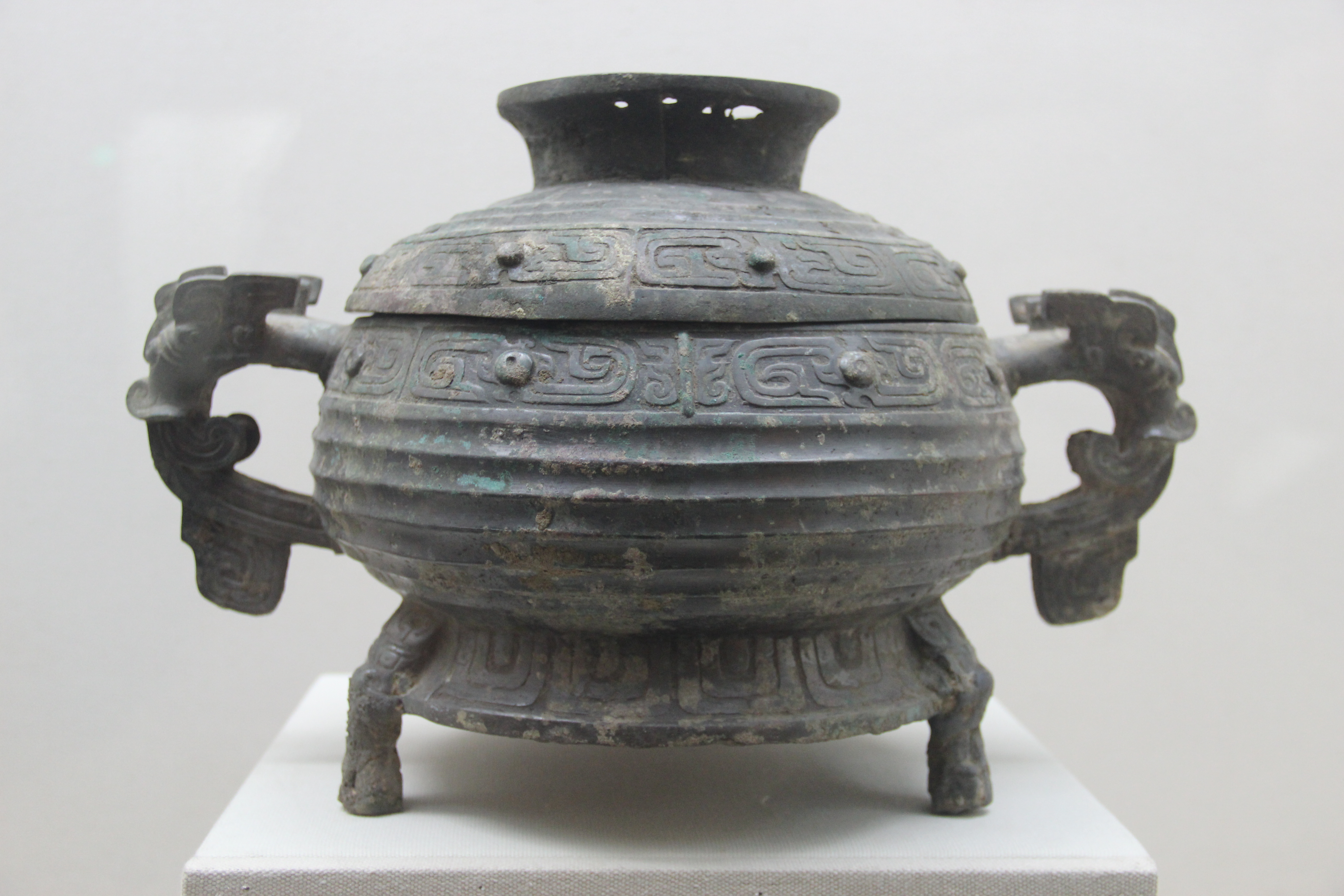
Bronze gui tureen unearthed from the Xiaoheishigou Site, Upper Xiajiadian Culture. Inner Mongolia Museum.

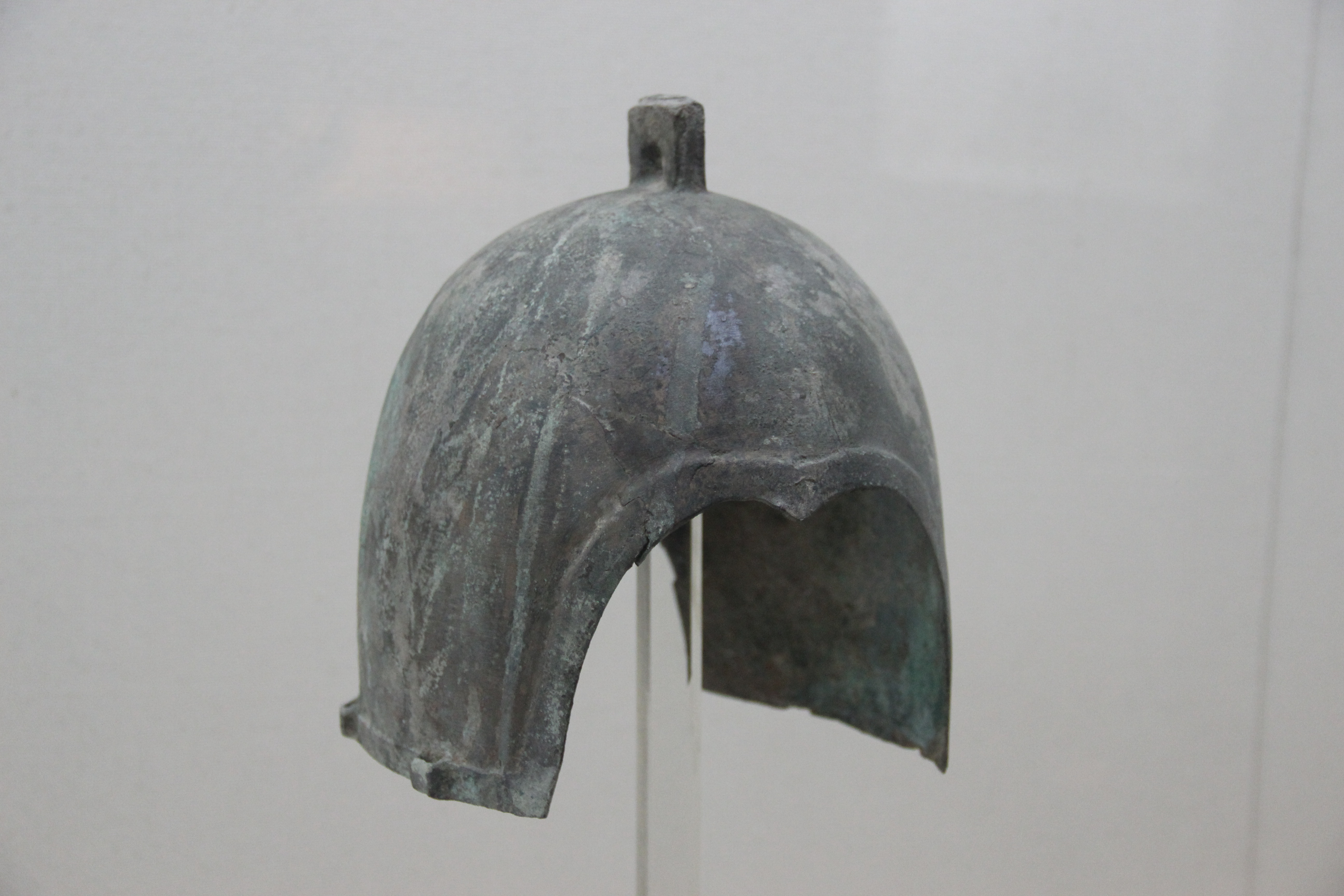
Bronze helmet, Upper Xiajiadian Culture later period.

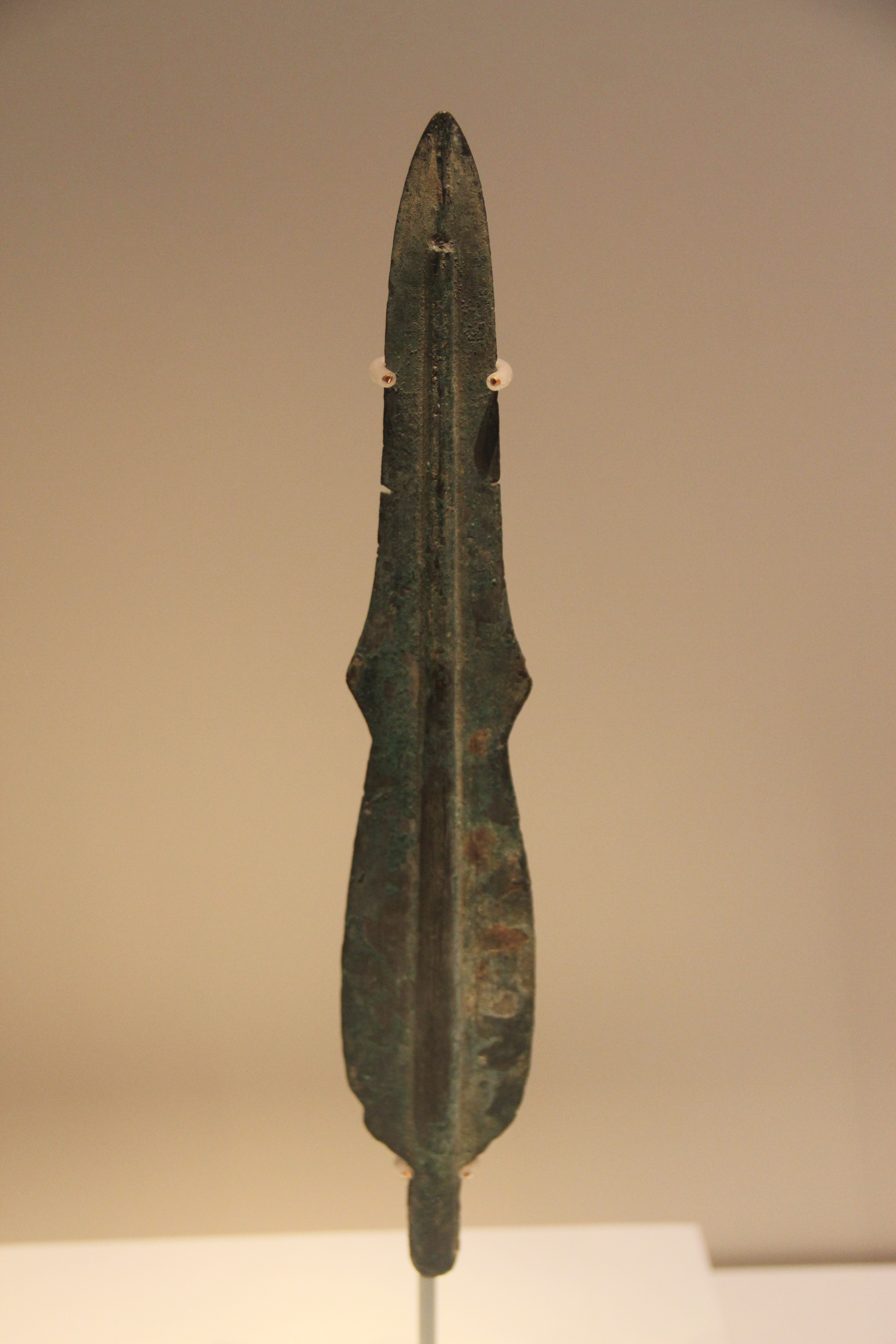
"Liaoning dagger" (bronze), Upper Xiajiadian.

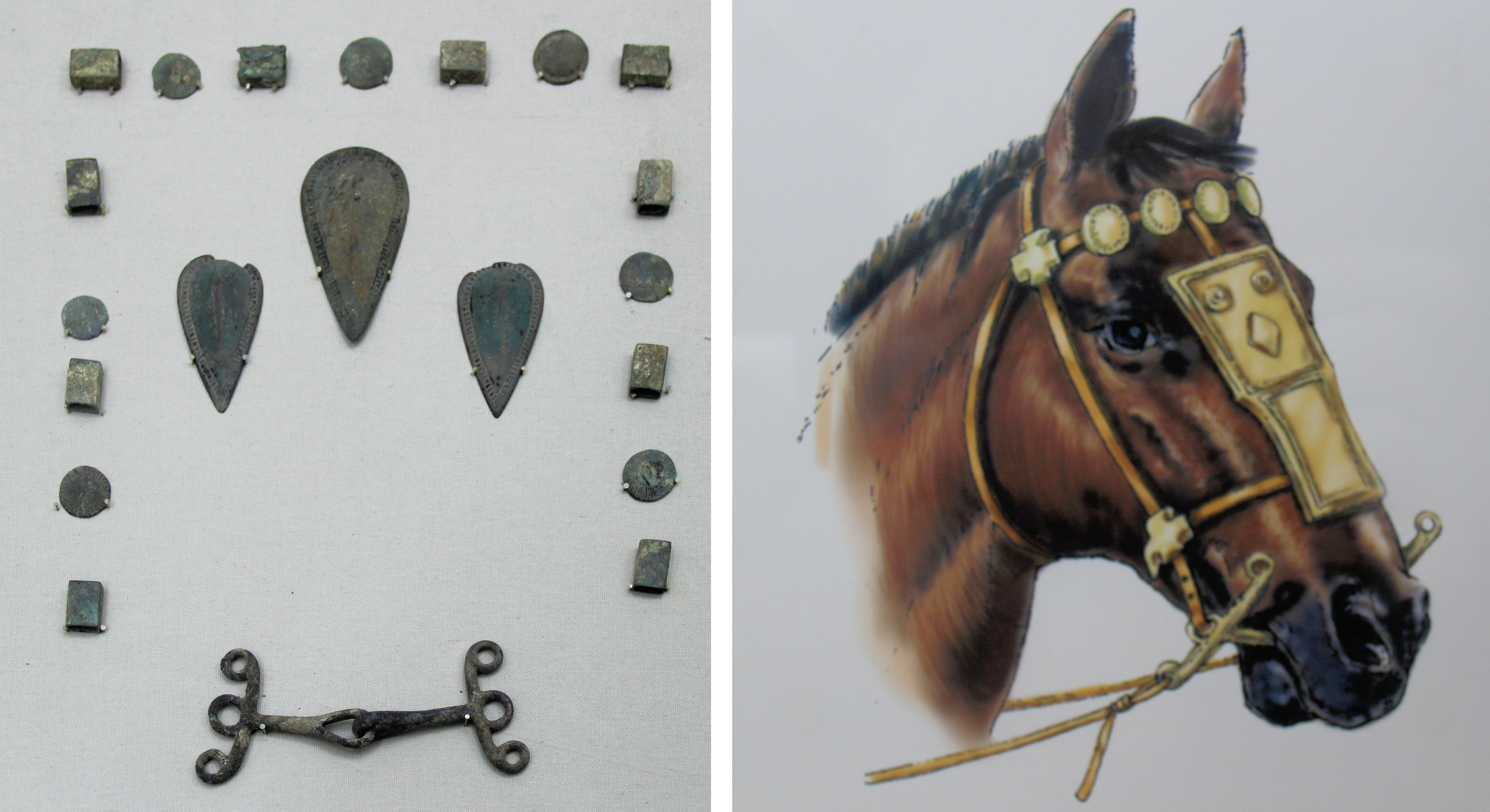
Horse bit and harness ornaments. Upper Xiajiadian culture

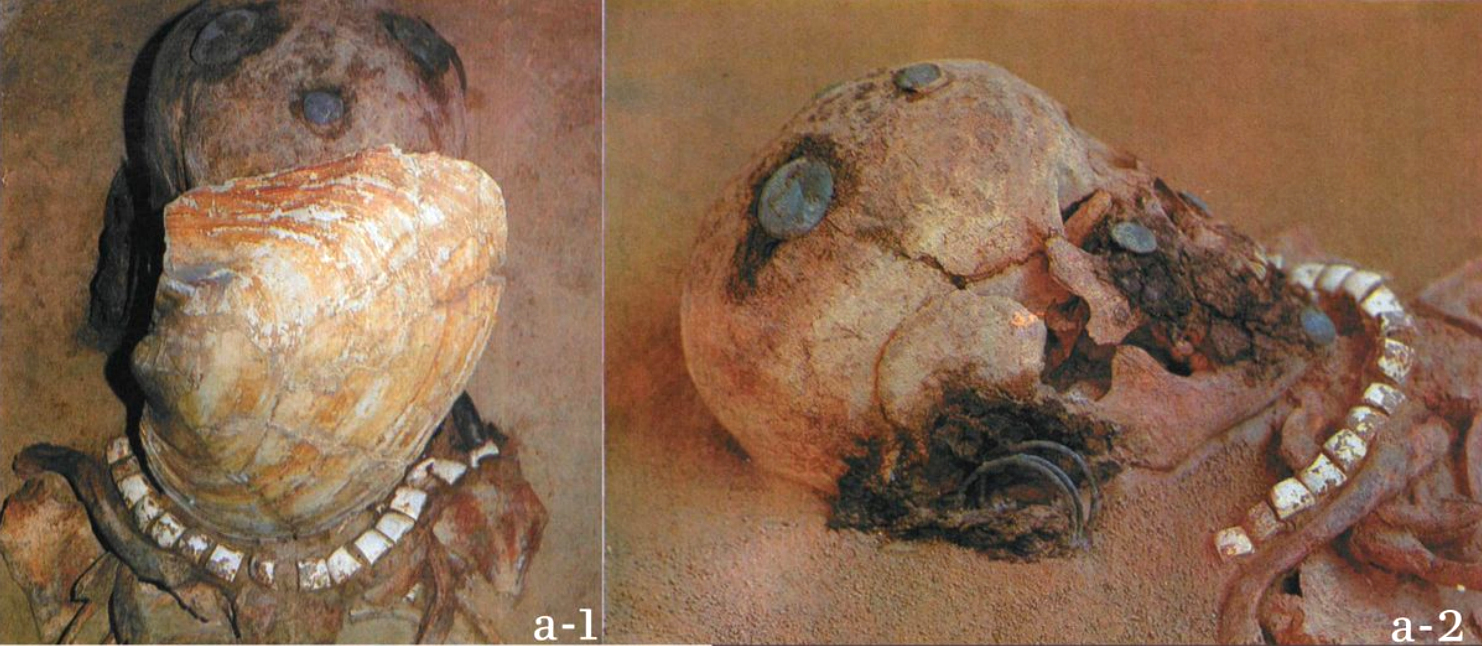
Burial at Zhoujiadi cemetery (with and without mussel mask), an ancestor of the Donghu clan, Upper Xiajiadian culture (1000–600 BCE).

== See also ==
- Lower Xiajiadian culture

== Bibliography ==
- Shelach, Gideon (1999). Leadership Strategies, Economic Activity, and Interregional Interaction: Social Complexity in Northeast China. Springer. ISBN 9780306460906.
- Barnes, Gina Lee (1993). The Rise of Civilization in East Asia: the Archaeology of China, Korea and Japan. Thames and Hudson. ISBN 0500279748.
