= Yinan tombs =

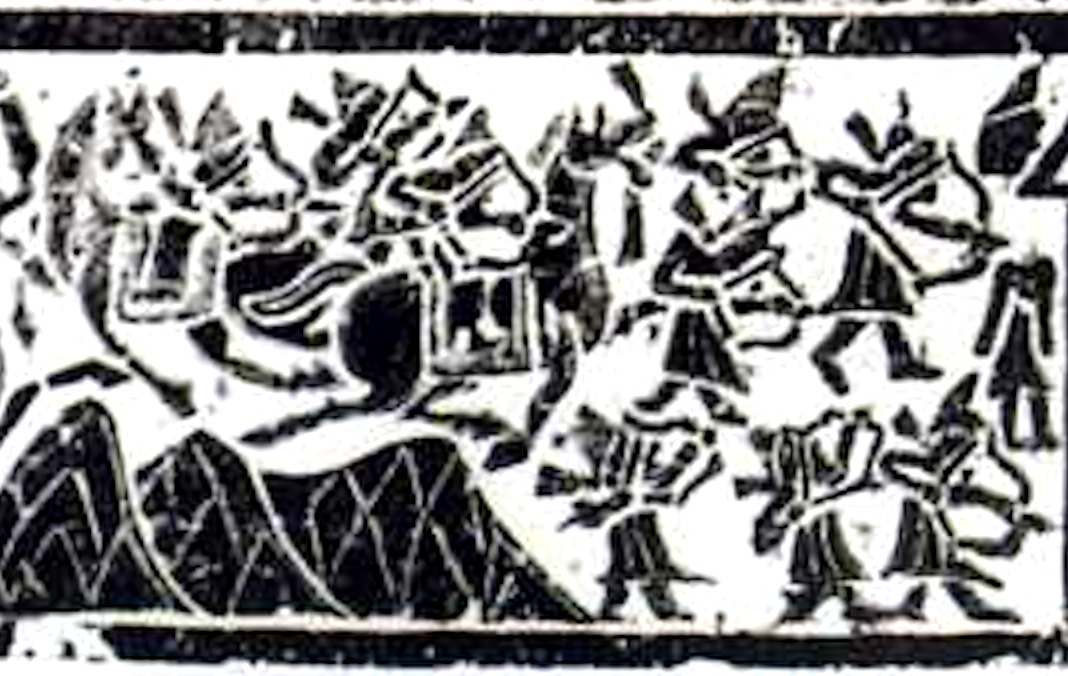
Yinan relief, depicting an attack by Hu barbarians. 2nd century CE, Eastern Han.

The Yinan tombs or Yi’nan tombs, also Beizhai tombs (Ch: 北寨墓群, Běizhài mùqún, 沂南汉墓, Yinan Hanmu) are tombs from the late Eastern Han Dynasty period located in Beizhai Village, Jiehu Township, Yinan County, Linyi Prefecture-level City, Shandong Province, People's Republic of China. The tombs were discovered in 1954. The Yinan tombs date to 168-189 CE.

The tombs display monumental architecture, and particularly corbelled (or "lantern") roofs, a technique well known in ancient West Asia, which may have been the result of west–east transmission.

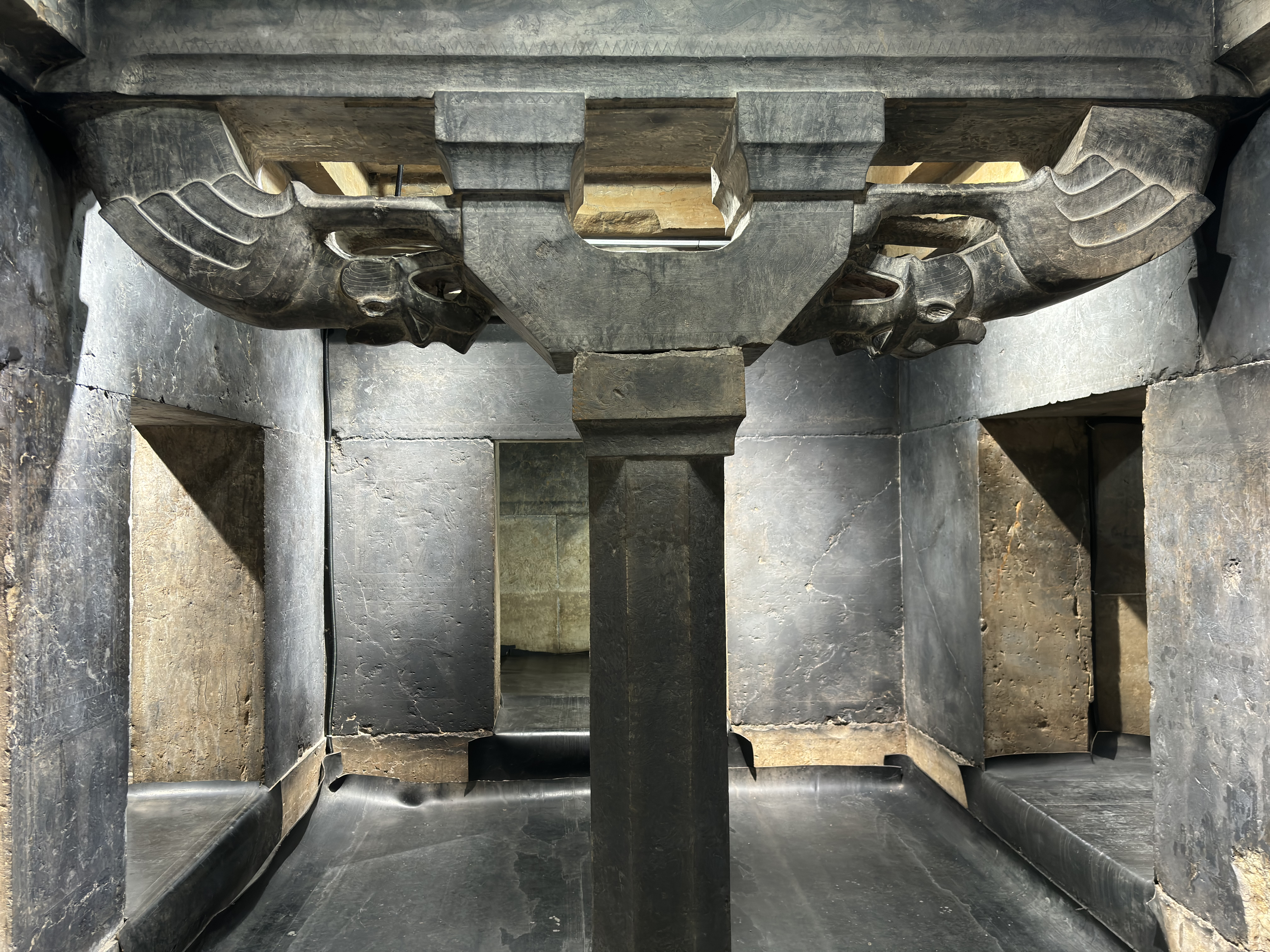

The tombs have 42 stone reliefs, showing war scenes, sacrificial scenes, processions as well as music and dance scenes. The picture called Yuewu baixi tu (乐舞百戏图), for example, provides deep insights into the history of Chinese acrobatics. Several reliefs also display battles between the Han and the Hu barbarians. The Hu soldiers have bows and arrows, and high pointed hats. They are shown as coming from mountain areas.

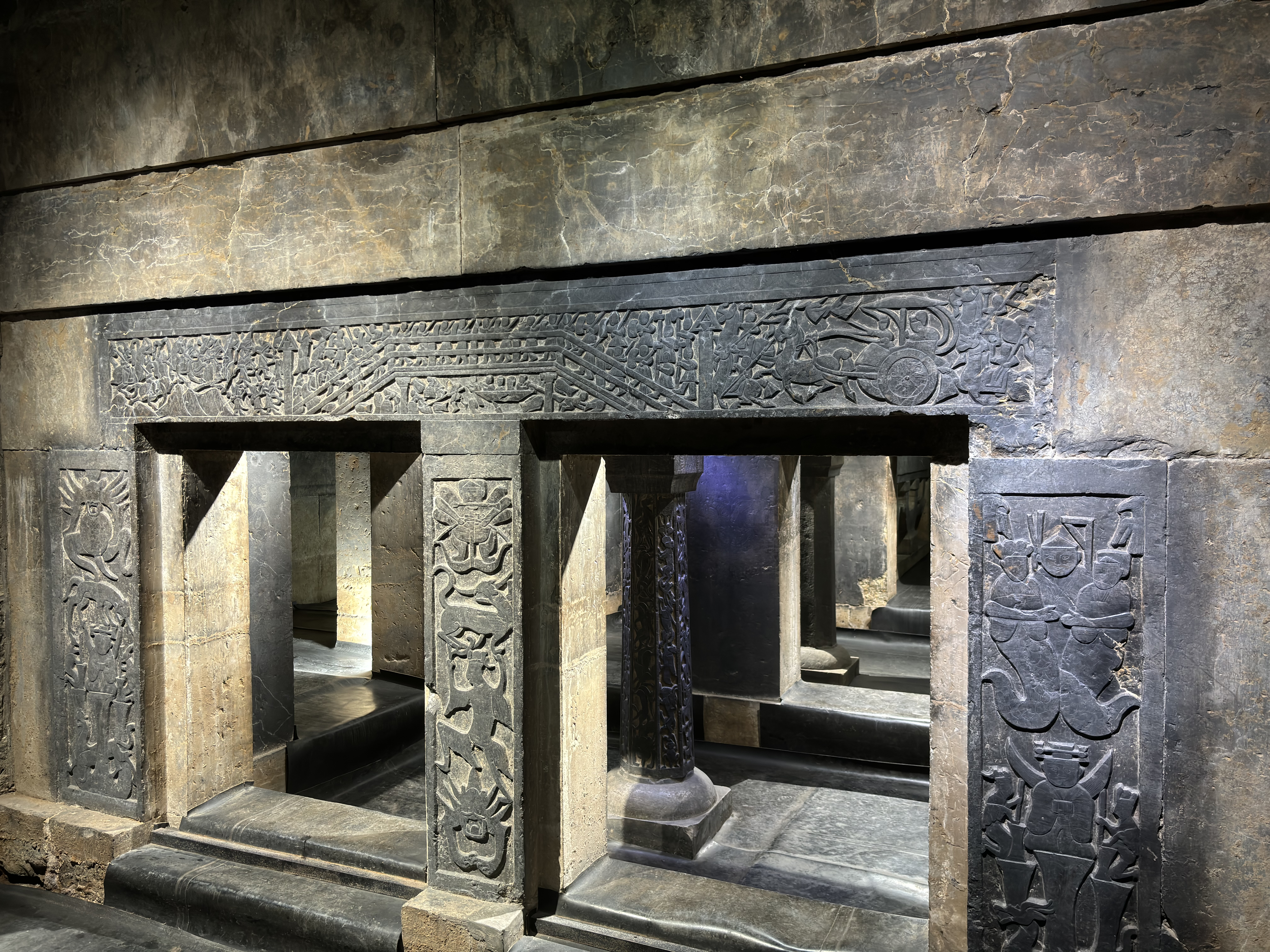

The tombs have been on the list of monuments of the People's Republic of China (5-169) since 2001 .

A museum was built at the site, the Yinan Han Tombs Museum (沂南汉墓博物馆, Yinan Hanmu Bowuguan), which is also called the Beizhai Han Tombs Museum (北寨汉墓博物馆, Beizhai Hanmu bowuguan).

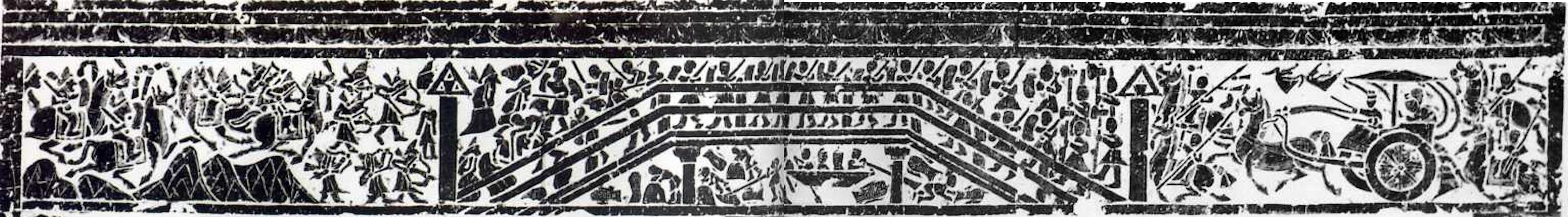
Yinan battle scene between Hu and Han, 2nd century CE, Eastern Han.
