= Sarah Milledge Nelson =

American archaeologist (1931–2020)

- Born: 29 November 1931; Florida, US
- Died: April 27, 2020 (aged 88)
- Occupation: Archaeologist
- Known for: Archaeology of Korea and northeast China
- Title: Professor Emeritus

Academic background
- Education: Wellesley College (BA); University of Michigan (MA and PhD)

Academic work
- Discipline: Archaeologist, Anthropologist
- Sub-discipline: Archaeology and history of East Asia, Gender archaeology
- Institutions: University of Denver
- Notable works: The Archaeology of Korea (1993); Gender in Archaeology: Analyzing Power and Prestige (1997); Handbook of Gender in Archaeology, ed. (2006)

Sarah Milledge Nelson (November 29, 1931 – April 27, 2020) was an American archaeologist and Distinguished Professor Emerita from the Department of Anthropology, University of Denver, United States.

Nelson was raised in Florida and obtained her PhD from the University of Michigan in 1973. Nelson was known for her research on the archaeology of East Asia, in particular Korea and northeast China. She also conducted extensive research in the archaeology of gender and Hongshan culture. She was also well known for her work on gender and archaeology and for her fiction writing about ancient East Asia. Nelson died at the age of 88 in 2020 after a long illness.

== Selected bibliography ==
- Chulmun Period Villages on the Han River in Korea, Subsistence and Settlement. PhD Dissertation, University of Michigan, 1973.
- The Neolithic of Northeastern China and Korea. Antiquity 64(243):234–248, 1990.
- "Diversity of the Upper Paleolithic "Venus" Figurines and Archaeological Mythology," in Powers of Observation, Alternative Views in Archaeology. S.M. Nelson and Alice B. Kehoe, eds., pp. 11–22; 1990
- Gender Hierarchy and the Queens of Silla. In Sex and Gender Hierarchies, edited by B.D. Miller. Cambridge: Cambridge University Press, 1992.
- The Archaeology of Korea. Cambridge: Cambridge University Press, 1993. ISBN 0-521-40783-4
- (with Margaret Nelson and Alison Wylie, editors), Equity Issues for Women in Archaeology, American Anthropological Association, Washington, DC, 1994;
- The Archaeology of Northeast China. Routledge Press, London, England, 1995;
- The Politics of Ethnicity in Prehistoric Korea. In Kohl, P.L. and C. Fawcett, eds. Nationalism, Politics, and the Practice of Archaeology.Cambridge: Cambridge University Press, 1995:218–231.
- (editor) The Archaeology of Northeast China: Beyond the Great Wall. London: Routledge, 1997. ISBN 0-415-11755-0
- Gender in Archaeology: Analyzing Power and Prestige, Walnut Creek: Altamira Press, 1997. Selected as a Choice Magazine Outstanding Academic Book
- Megalithic Monuments and the Introduction of Rice into Korea. In The Prehistory of Food: Appetites for Change, edited by C. Gosden and J. Hather, pp. 147–165. London: Routledge, 1999.
- Spirit Bird Journey, Denver: RKLOG Press, 1999
- (with K.L. Berry, R.F. Carillo, B.J. Clark, L.E. Rhodes, and D. Saitta) Denver: An Archaeological History. Scholarly Book Services Inc., 2002. ISBN 978-0-8122-3591-3
- (editor) Ancient Queens: Archaeological Explorations, Walnut Creek: Altamira Press, 2003. ISBN 978-0-7591-0346-7
- Jade Dragon, Denver: RKLOG Press, 2004
- (editor) Handbook of Gender in Archaeology, Walnut Creek CA: AltaMira Press, 2006
- Shamans, Queens and Figurines, The Development of Gender Archaeology Walnut Creek CA: Left Coast Press 2016
- Ancient China's Tiger Queen, CreateSpace, 2018

=== Regions of Archaeological Research ===
Nelson spent over two decades researching the queens of the Silla kingdom of early Korea, learning the culture while living there. She is able to read and speak at an intermediate level and learned basic writing skills in the Korean language.

Additionally, Nelson spent ten years in northeastern China studying the "goddess temple". While living here, she learned intermediate level reading and speaking as well as basic level writing. Her research endeavors in Europe, Korea and China contributed to her interest in gender issues. While in Europe, Nelson became fluent in speaking German, as well as intermediate level reading and writing. Additionally, she became fluent in reading in both Spanish and French with basic speaking and writing skills in both languages.

Culture change from the appearance of pottery to the formation of state interested Nelson, bringing her to conduct research on several different continents, as well as the distribution of knowledge of the Bronze Technology and the problems of origins of agriculture. While studying in Korea and China, millets were more common than rice in the area of agriculture.

In North America, Nelson has conducted research in south-eastern Utah as well as the Colorado high plains. She was drawn to these areas to examine problems such as the sedentism/mobility of archaeological sites and the distribution of site types. Shortly after, Nelson created and adapted several computer spatial programs intended for the use of both regional and site research.

In addition to gender issues, Nelson also enjoyed researching archaeoastronomy in Northeast Asia.

=== Archaeology of Gender ===
Nelson is one of the first archaeologists to focus on the archaeology of gender and to create the framework of a feminist archaeology. She coedited the first major collection of articles on this topic with Alice Beck Kehoe, (Powers of Observation), wrote the first textbook on the topic (Gender in Archaeology), edited the first reference volume (Handbook of Gender in Archaeology), as well as editing several other collections of articles on this topic. Her book series for AltaMira Press resulted in over a dozen books addressing gender issues in the ancient world across cultures. Her autobiographical work Shamans, Queens, and Figurines traces her personal biography from a young woman with small children starting a career in archaeology while living in Korea through her career development and the parallel development of feminist archaeology

=== Archaeological Fiction ===
Nelson used her archaeological knowledge to create fiction about the ancient world of East Asia. Published first by her own press, RKLOG Press, and now available from Routledge, her novels Spirit Bird Journey, Jade Dragon, and Tiger Queen, addressed ancient Korea, Neolithic China, and Shang China, toggling back and forth from a narrative about the past to the life of a contemporary archaeology graduate student studying these periods.

== Education ==
- B.A., Biblical History, Wellesley College, 1953;
- M.A., Anthropology, University of Michigan, 1969;
- Ph.D., Anthropology (Archaeology), University of Michigan, 1973

== Career ==
Sarah Milledge Nelson was Distinguished Professor Emerita at the University of Denver. Her past positions held include:

- 1996-2007, University of Denver, Distinguished Professor
- 1985-1996, University of Denver, Professor
- 1979–1985, University of Denver, Associate Professor;
- 1974–1979, University of Denver, Assistant Professor;
- 1974, University of Colorado, Boulder, Visiting Assistant Professor;
- 1971, University of Maryland, Far East Division, (Korea), Instructor;
- 1970, University of Denver, Part-time Instructor

Nelson was president of the Society of East Asian Archaeology (1998–2004)

== See also ==
- Jeulmun Pottery Period
- Korean Three Kingdoms
- Choi Mong-lyong
- Kim Won-yong
- Richard J. Pearson
- Sim Bong-geun
