= Kim Jeong-hak =

Korean archaeologist (1911–2006)

- Hangul: 김정학
- Hanja: 金廷鶴
- RR: Gim Jeonghak
- MR: Kim Chŏnghak

Kim Jeong-hak (October 16, 1911 – April 25, 2006) was a Korean archaeologist.

Born in Munch'ŏn, Korea, Empire of Japan, Kim first studied archaeology and folklore at Keijo Imperial University, the colonial predecessor of Seoul National University. He also studied for a time at Harvard University in the United States.

Kim was one among the first generation of post-colonial, post-Korean War archaeologists in South Korea along with others such as Kim Won-yong. He taught archaeology at Seoul National University for a time and moved to Korea University in 1947 and became one of the founding faculty members of the Department of History. He also served as the Director of the Korea University Museum. He moved to Yeungnam University in 1968 and served as a professor and museum director at Pusan National University through most of the 1970s.

Kim was known for his expertise in the pottery and bronze culture of the Mumun Pottery Period. His book, The Prehistory of Korea, was one of the few publications existing on Korean prehistory in English for much of the latter half of the 20th century.

== Selected bibliography ==
- Ethnological Origin of Korean Nation. Korea Journal 3(6):5-8, 1963.
- The Origin of Korean Nation. Korea Journal 3(7):29-31, 1963.
- The Prehistory of Korea. Trans. by Richard J. Pearson and Kazue Pearson. University of Hawaii Press, Honolulu, 237 pp., 1978. ISBN 0-8248-0552-6

== See also ==
- Choi Mong-lyong – South Korean archaeologist
- Kim Jung-bae – South Korean archaeologist (born 1940)
- Kim Won-yong – South Korean archaeologist (1922–1993)
- Richard J. Pearson – Canadian archaeologist
- Sim Bong-geun – Korean archaeologist
- To Yu-ho – North Korean archaeologist
