= To Yu-ho =

North Korean archaeologist

- Hangul: 도유호
- Hanja: 都宥浩
- RR: Do Yuho
- MR: To Yuho

To Yu-ho (1 July 1905 – 1982) was a North Korean archaeologist and member of the Supreme People's Assembly, North Korea's unicameral parliament.

To was born and raised in Hamhŭng. He earned a doctoral degree at Vienna University in Austria in 1935, was perhaps the first Korean archaeologist and among the first Korean academics to have received their training overseas. He married a German woman and returned to North Korea in the late 1940s. Do became a professor at Kim Il Sung University in P'yŏngyang in 1947 and served as the director of a number of archaeological institutes through the 1960s. He also served in several capacities in the North Korean government, including as a representative in the Supreme People's Assembly in the early 1960s and in the Standing Committee of the Supreme People's Assembly from the mid-1960s.

To was responsible for leading archaeological excavations at North Korean sites such as Kulp'o-ri, Ch'itam-ni, Odong, Allak, Ch'o-do, and Kungsan-ni. To's major monograph, Chosŏn Wŏnsi Kogohak, laid the groundwork for archaeological research in North Korea from the 1960s through the 1990s.

== Selected bibliography ==
- Chosŏn Wŏnsi Kogohak [Prehistoric Archaeology of Chosŏn]. Institute of Science Publications, P'yŏngyang, 1960.
- To, Yu-ho and Ki-dŏk Hwang. Ch'itam-ni Wŏnsi Yujŏk Palgul Pogo [Excavation Report of the Ch'itam-ni Prehistoric Site]. Kwahagwŏn Ch'ulpan'sa, P'yŏngyang, 1961.

== See also ==
- Kim Won-yong
- Kim Jung-bae
- Richard J. Pearson
- Choi Mong-lyong
- Sim Bong-geun
