= Dawenkou culture =

Chinese Neolithic culture

- Geographical range: North China
- Period: Neolithic China
- Dates: c. 4300 – c. 2600 BC
- Preceded by: Beixin culture
- Followed by: Longshan culture

Chinese name
- Chinese: 大汶口文化
Transcriptions
Standard Mandarin
- Hanyu Pinyin: Dàwènkǒu wénhuà

The Dawenkou culture was a Chinese Neolithic culture primarily located in the eastern province of Shandong, but also appearing in Anhui, Henan and Jiangsu. The culture existed from 4300 to 2600 BC, and co-existed with the Yangshao culture. Turquoise, jade and ivory artefacts are commonly found at Dawenkou sites. The earliest examples of alligator drums appear at Dawenkou sites. Neolithic signs, perhaps related to subsequent scripts, such as those of the Shang dynasty, have been found on Dawenkou pottery. Additionally, the Dawenkou practiced dental ablation and cranial deformation, practices that disappeared in China by the Chinese Bronze Age.

== Chronology ==
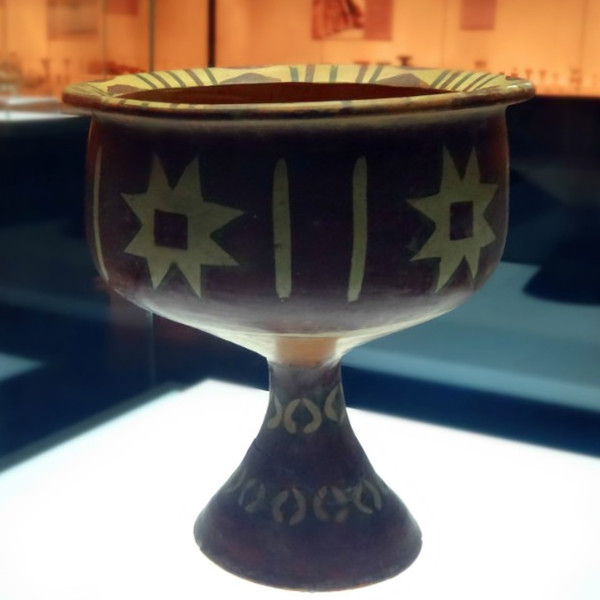
Stemmed vessel (dou 豆) with painted star motif

Archaeologists commonly divide the culture into three phases: the early phase (4100–3500 BC), the middle phase (3500–3000 BC) and the late phase (3000–2600 BC). Based on the evidence from grave goods, the early phase was highly egalitarian. The phase is typified by the presence of individually designed, long-stemmed cups. Graves built with earthen ledges became increasingly common during the latter parts of the early phase. During the middle phase, grave goods began to emphasize quantity over diversity. During the late phase, wooden coffins began to appear in Dawenkou burials. The culture became increasingly stratified, as some graves contained no grave goods while others contained a large quantity of grave goods.

The type site at Dawenkou, located in Tai'an, Shandong, was excavated in 1959, 1974 and 1978. Only the middle layer at Dawenkou is associated with the Dawenkou culture, as the earliest layer corresponds to the Beixin culture and the latest layer corresponds to the early Shandong variant of the Longshan culture.

== Political organization ==
The Dawenkou culture and other contemporary cultures c. 3000 BC

The term "chiefdom" seems to be appropriate to describe the political organization of the Dawenkou. A dominant kin group likely held sway over Dawenkou village sites, though power was most likely manifested through religious authority rather than coercion. Unlike the Beixin culture from which they descend, the people of the Dawenkou culture were noted for being engaged in violent conflict. Scholars suspect that they may have engaged in raids for land, crops, livestock and prestige goods.

== Agriculture and diet ==
The warm and wet climate of the Dawenkou area was suitable for a variety of crops, though they primarily farmed millet at most sites. Their production of millet was quite successful and storage containers have been found that could have contained up to 2000 kg of millet, once decomposition is accounted for, have been found. For some of the southern Dawenkou sites, rice was a more important crop however, especially during the late Dawenkou period. Analysis done on human remains at Dawenkou sites in southern Shandong revealed that the diet of upper-class Dawenkou individuals consisted mainly of rice, while ordinary individuals ate primarily millet.

The Dawenkou people successfully domesticated chicken, dogs, pigs and cattle, but no evidence of horse domestication was found. Pig remains are by far most abundant, accounting for about 85% of the total, and are thought to be the most important domesticated animal. Pig remains were also found in Dawenkou burials also highlighting their importance. Seafood was also an important staple of the Dawenkou diet. Fish and various shellfish mounds have been found in the early periods indicating that they were important food sources. Although these piles became less frequent in the later stages, seafood remained an important part of the diet.

== Culture ==
Dawenkou's inhabitants were one of the earliest practitioners of trepanation in prehistoric China. A skull of a Dawenkou man dating to 3000 BC was found with severe head injuries which appeared to have been remedied by this primitive surgery. Alligator hide drums have also been found in Dawenkou sites. Recently genetic studies have shown the possibility of matrilineality in one community of the Dawenkou culture.

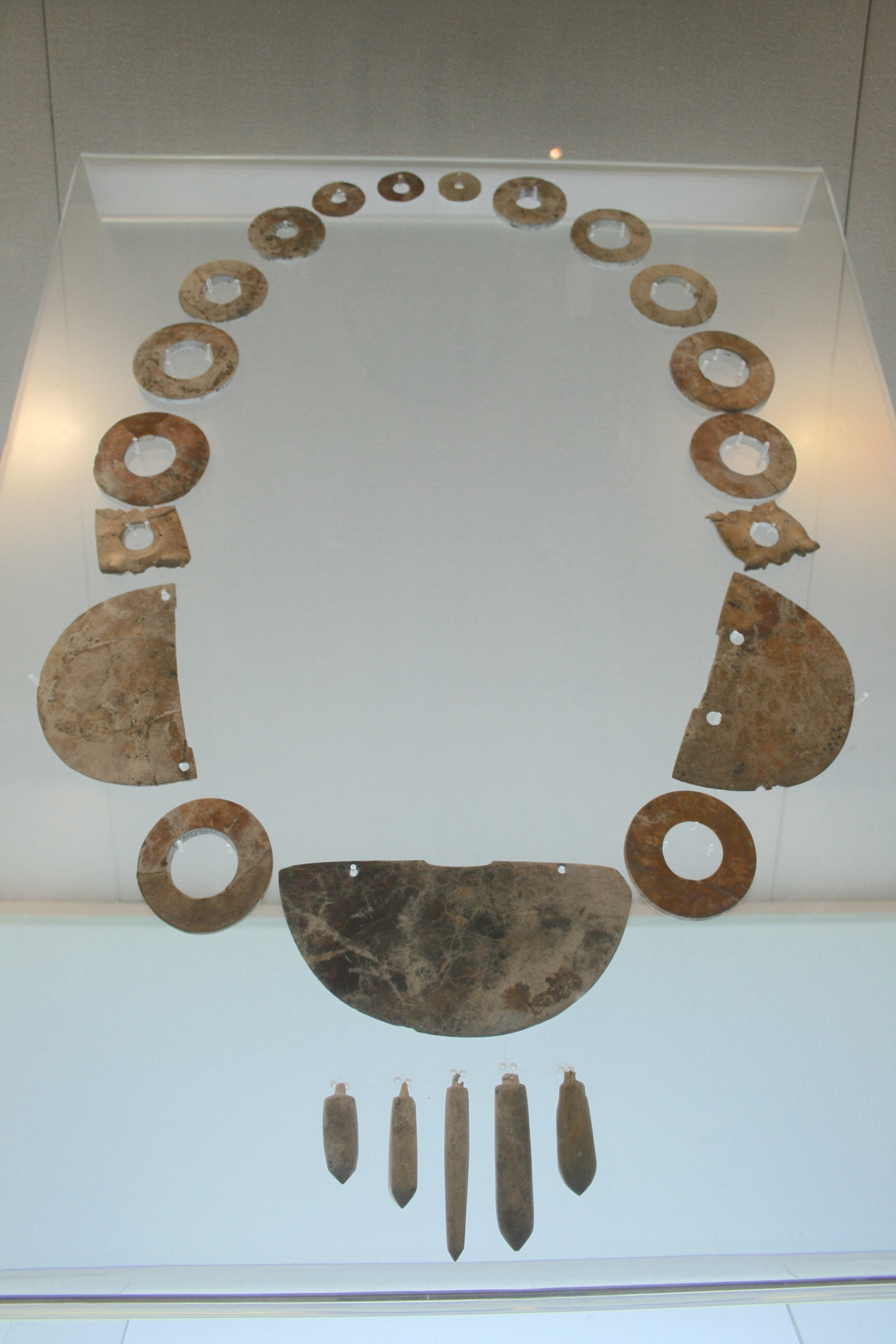
Jade necklace, dated between 3500 and 2600 BC

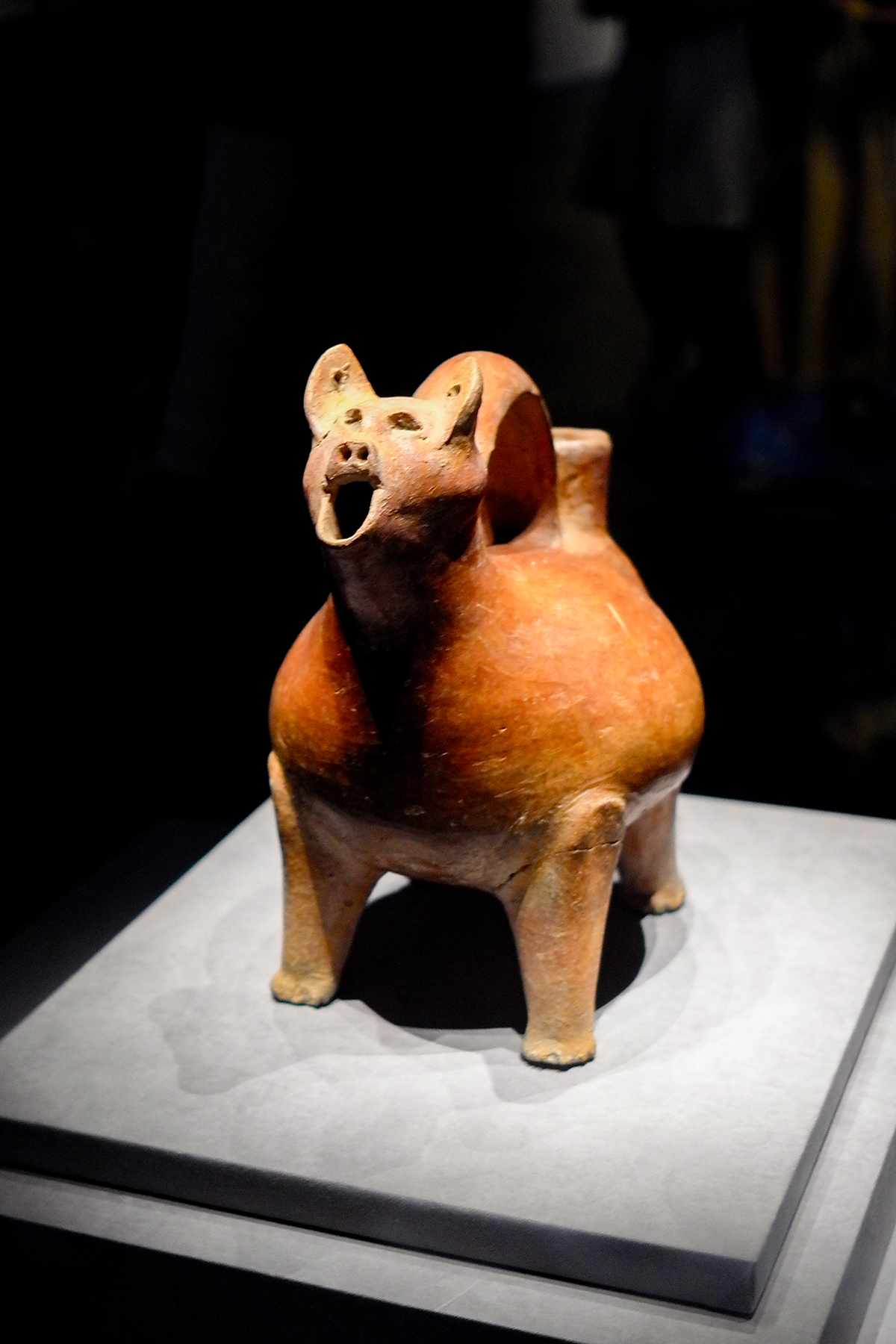
Red animal-shaped vessel

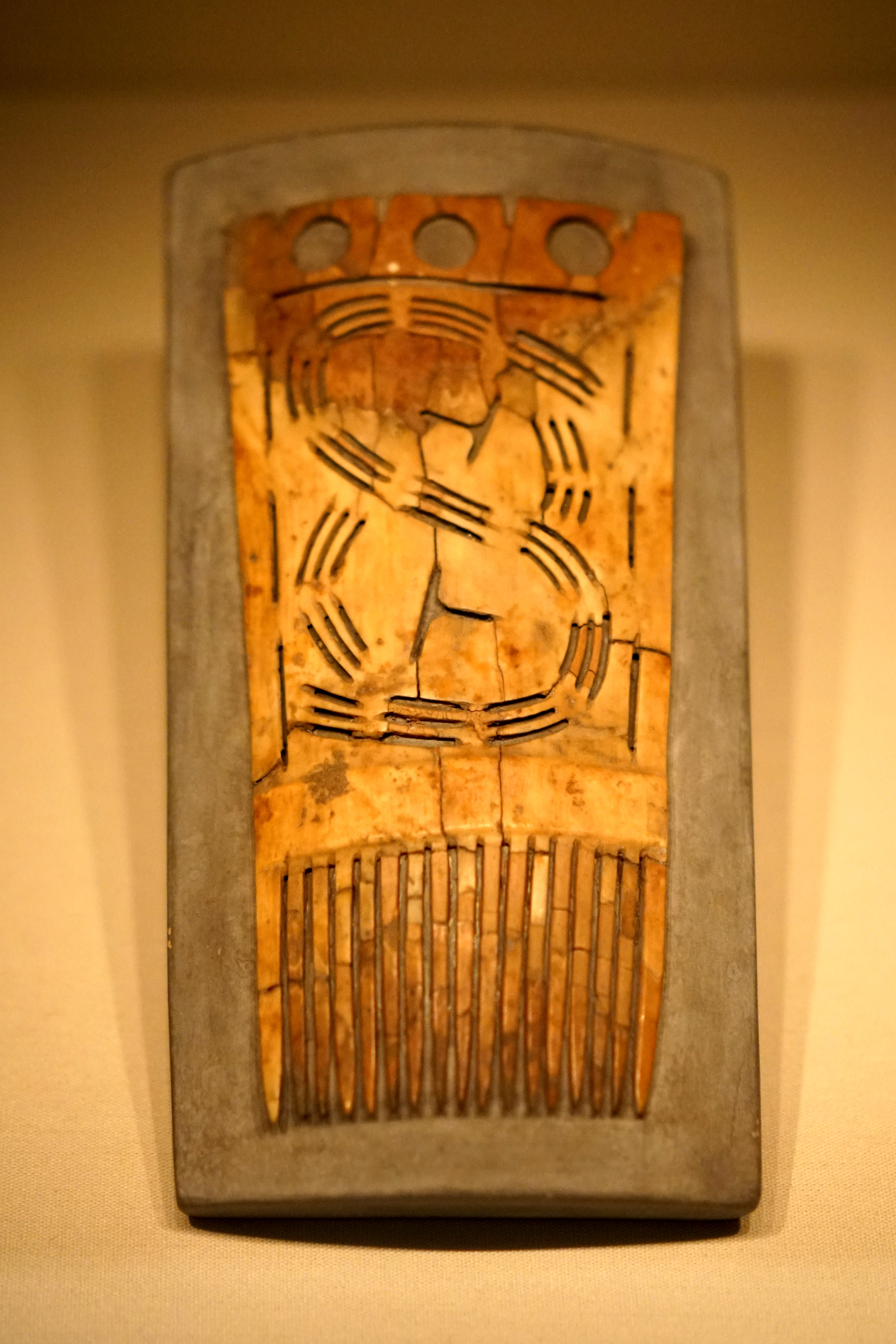
Ivory comb with openwork design

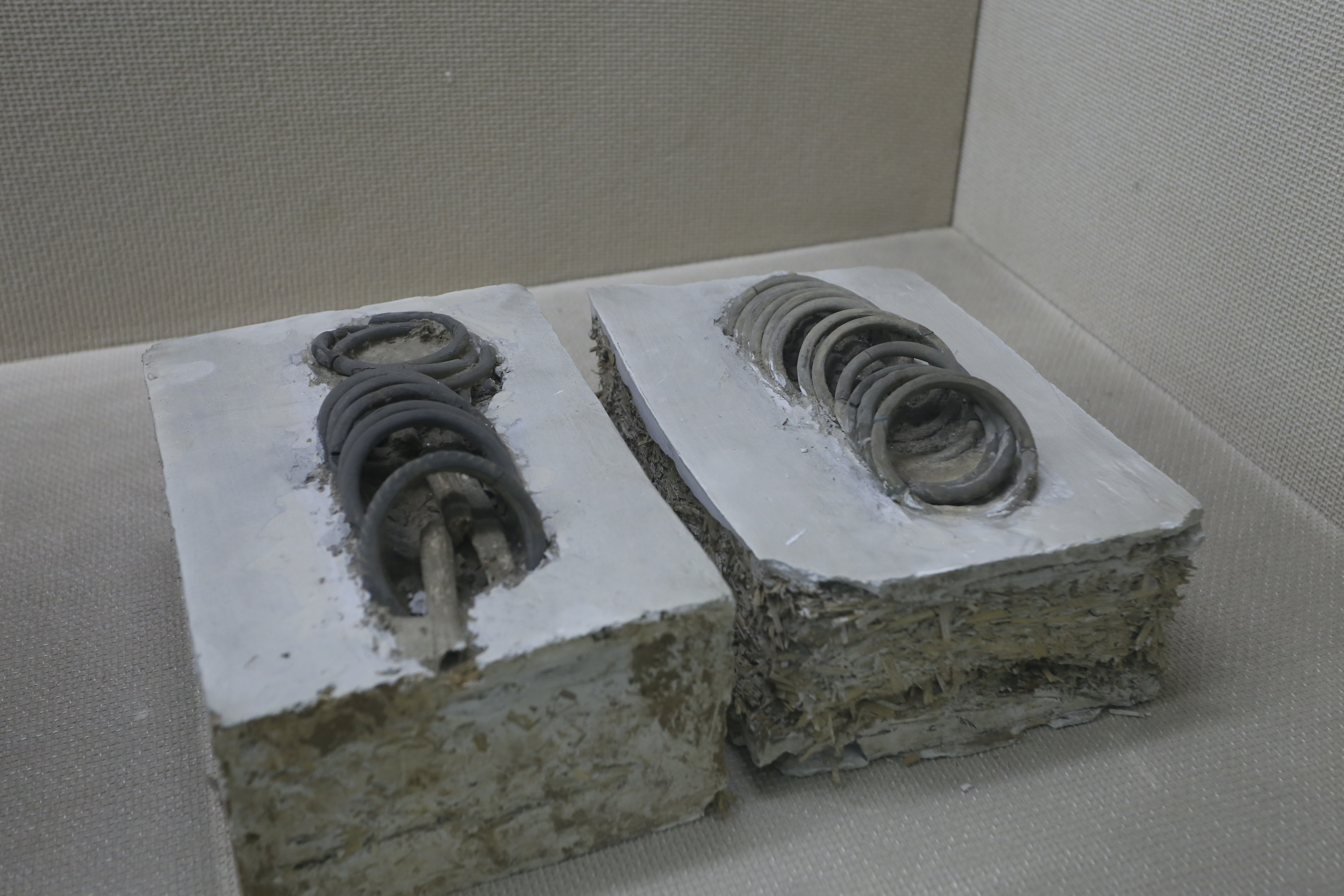
Ceramic bracelets or rings

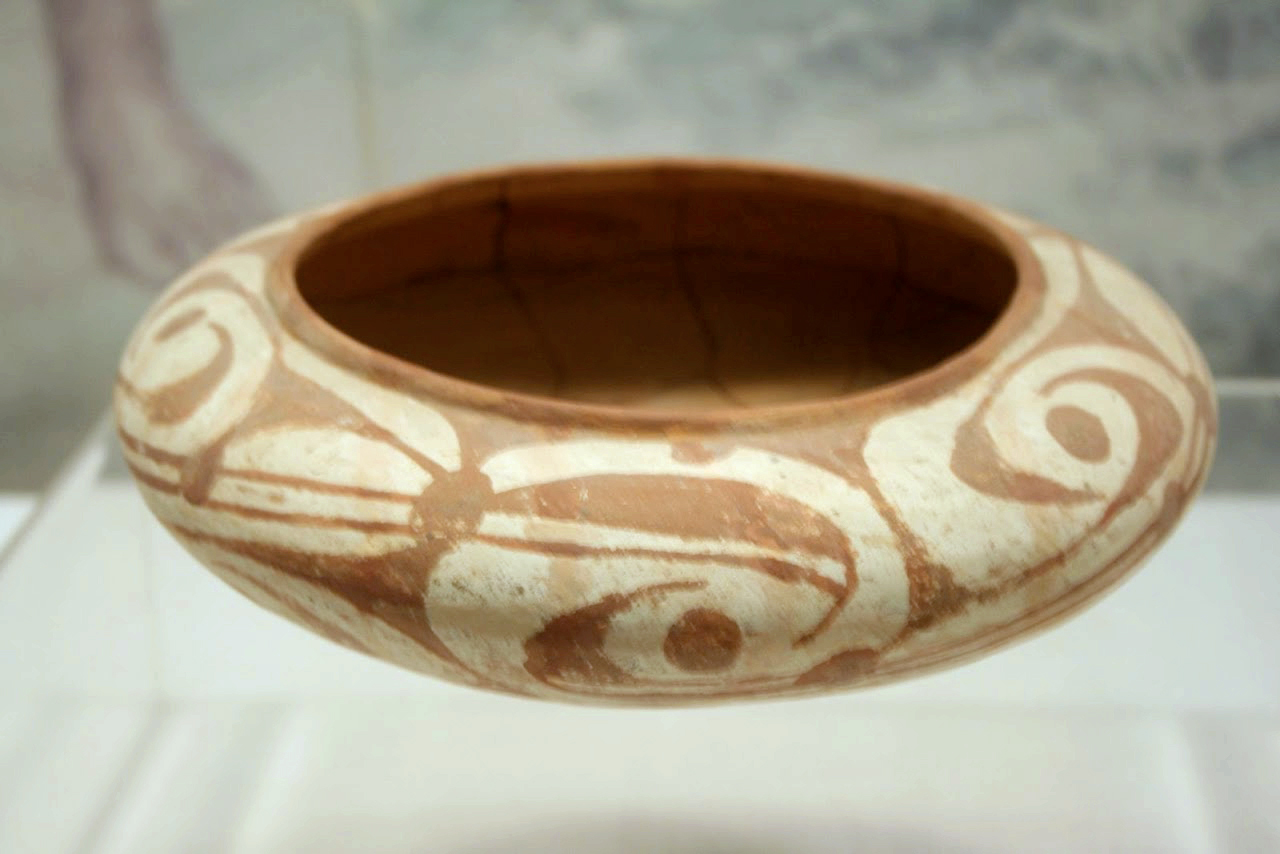
Painted bowl, dated circa 3500 BC

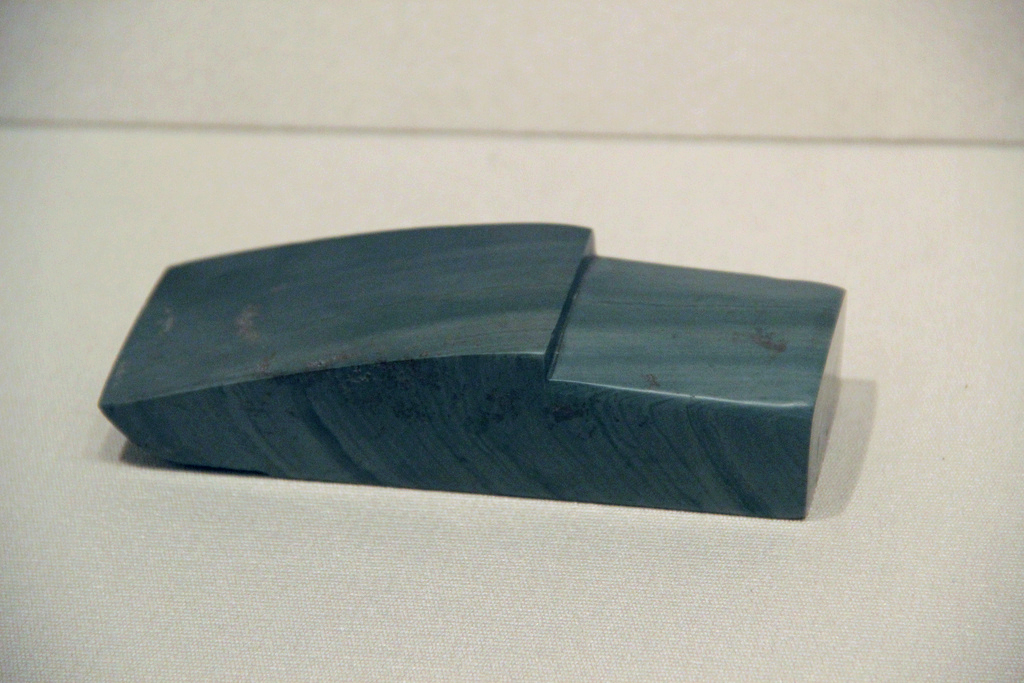
Stone adze

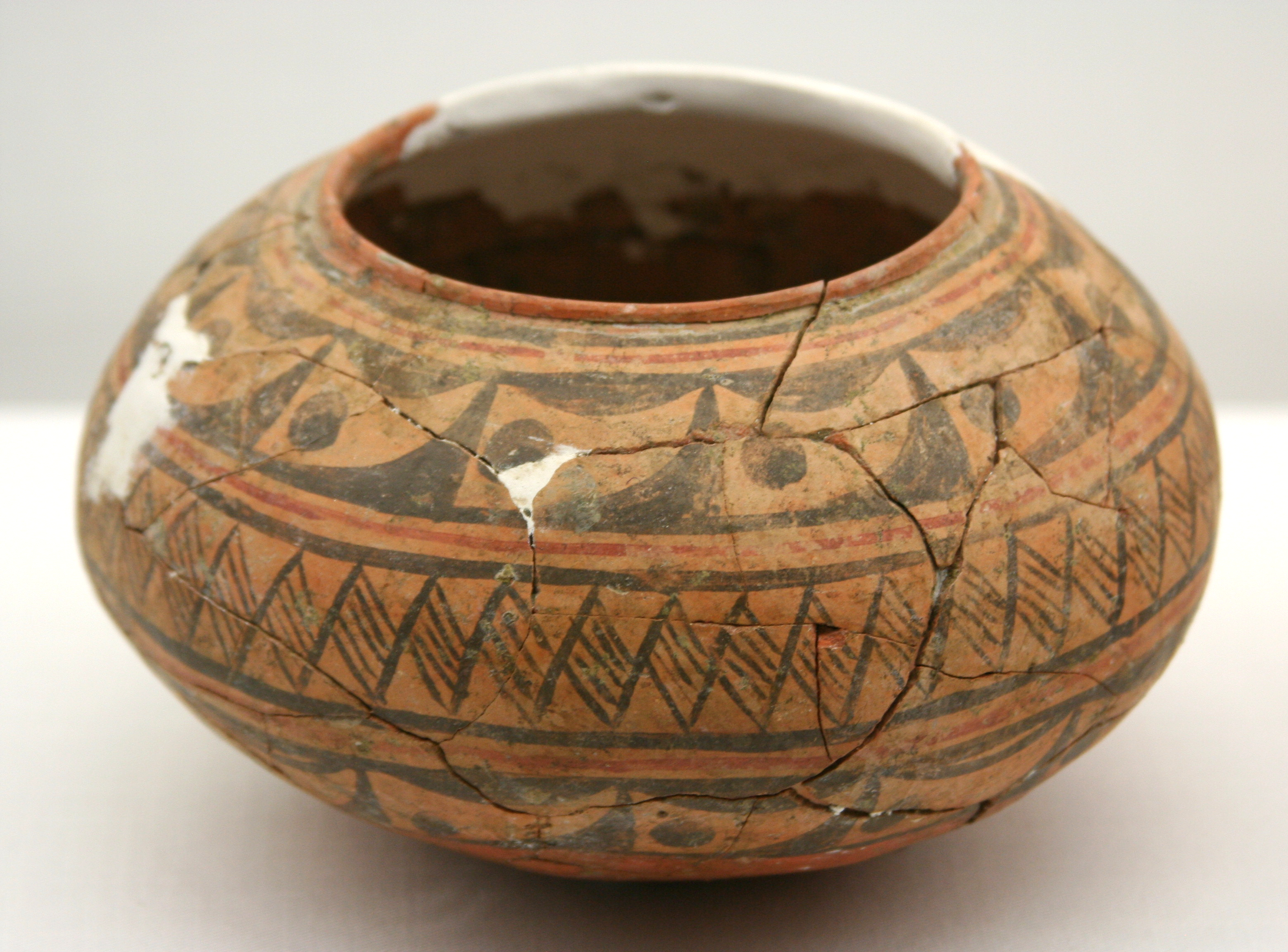
Painted Pottery A Container (c. 3,800—3,300 BCE) Excavated at the Diaolongbei Site, Zaoyang, Hubei. Capital Museum, Beijing.

== Interactions with other cultures ==
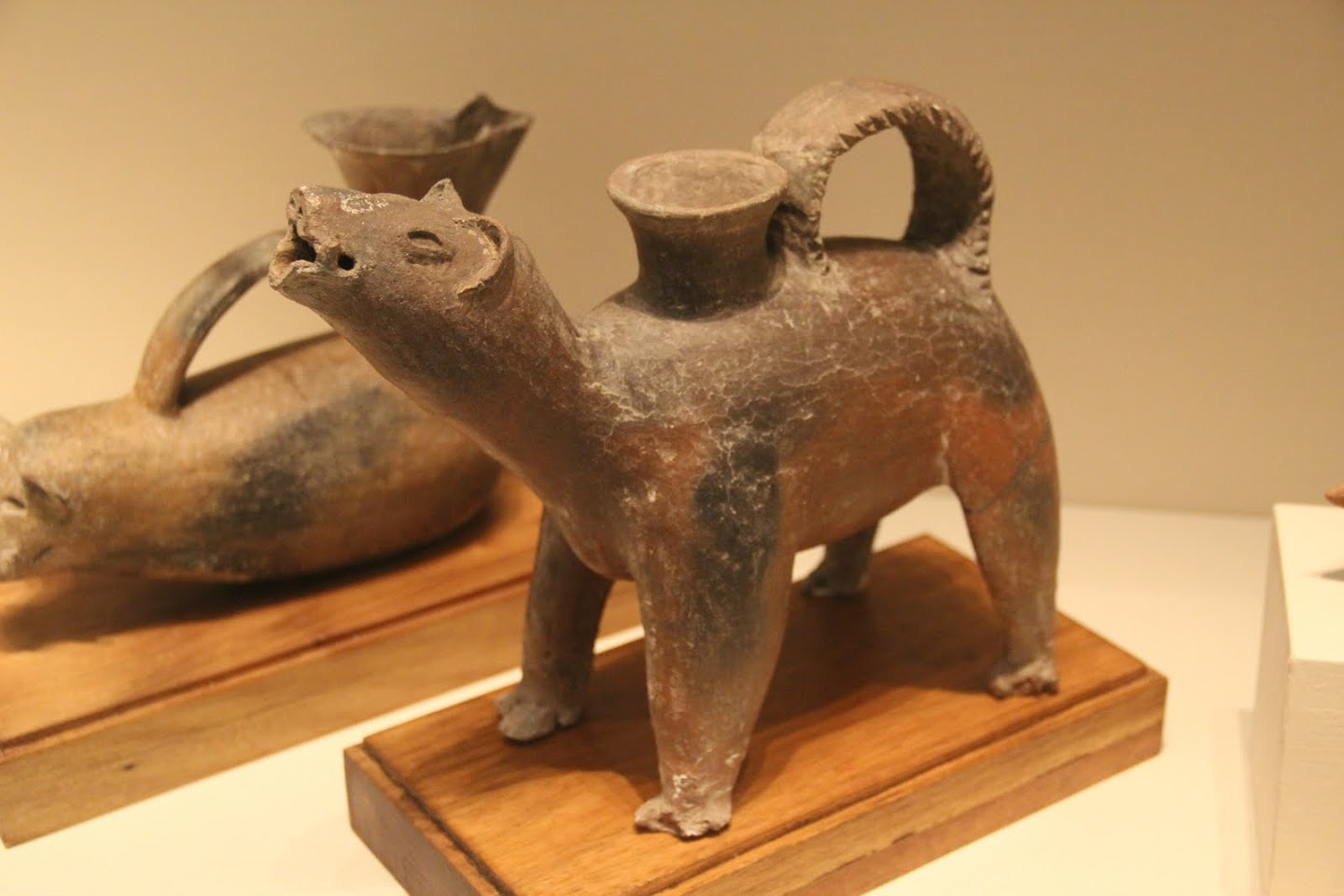
Dog-shaped vessel

The Dawenkou interacted extensively with the Yangshao culture. "For two and a half millennia of its existence the Dawenkou was, however, in a dynamic interchange with the Yangshao Culture, in which process of interaction it sometimes had the lead role, notably in generating Longshan. Scholars have also noted similarities between the Dawenkou and the Liangzhu culture as well as the related cultures of the Yangtze River basin. According to some scholars, the Dawenkou culture may have a link with a pre-Austronesian language. Other researchers also note a similarity between Dawenkou inhabitants and modern Austronesian peoples in cultural practices such as dental avulsion and architecture. However, the Dawenkou appeared to be genetically distinct from the pre-Austronesian cultures to their south.

== Physical characteristics ==
Symbol found on numerous Dawenkou pottery sherds, sometimes interpreted as a Sun and cloud

The physical similarity of the Jiahu people to the later Dawenkou (2600 BC±4300 BC) indicates that the Dawenkou might have descended from the Jiahu, following a slow migration along the middle and lower reaches of the Huai and Hanshui. Other scholars have also speculated that the Dawenkou originate in nearby regions to the south. The Dawenkou descends from the Beixin, but is deeply influenced by the northward-expanding Longqiuzhuang culture located between the Yangtze and Huai.

The people of Dawenkou exhibited a primarily Sinodont dental pattern. They practiced body modification in the form of dental ablation and cranial deformation.

Many Dawenkou burials exhibited cranial deformation and dental ablation, but both forms of modification had disappeared from mainland China by the beginning of the Bronze Age. No sex differences in the frequency of Dawenkou dental ablation were detected (60–90 percent). The most commonly extracted teeth were the upper incisors and canines, followed by the lower incisors. The majority of the teeth appear to have been knocked out between the ages of 13 and 15. The frequency of individuals with dental ablation among the Dawenkou drops to 50 percent over time.

The Dawenkou were also physically dissimilar to the Neolithic inhabitants of Hemudu, South China, and Taiwan. DNA testing revealed that the Neolithic inhabitants of Shandong were closer to ancient Northern East Asians. According to Liu et al 2021, their mtDNA results reveal that between 9500BP and 1800BP, significant southern East Asian mitochondrial haplogroups were present in the ancient Shandong population. After the middle Dawenkou period, a significant influx of middle Yellow River farmer ancestry from the Yangshao culture mixed with the populations of Shandong. The people of the Shandong Longshan culture inherited much of their ancestry from the Dawenkou culture, indicating genetic continuity between the two groups.

According to a 2024 study, populations from the Dawenkou period could be divided into three sub-groups: populations from the Ercun and Xixiahou sites show the closest affinities with Middle Neolithic Yellow River farmers; those from the Fujia, Wucun and Dawenkou sites show extra genetic affinity with Shandong hunter-gatherers; those from the Wutai and Sanlihe sites show extra affinities with southern East Asian-related populations through direct admixture.

== Gallery ==
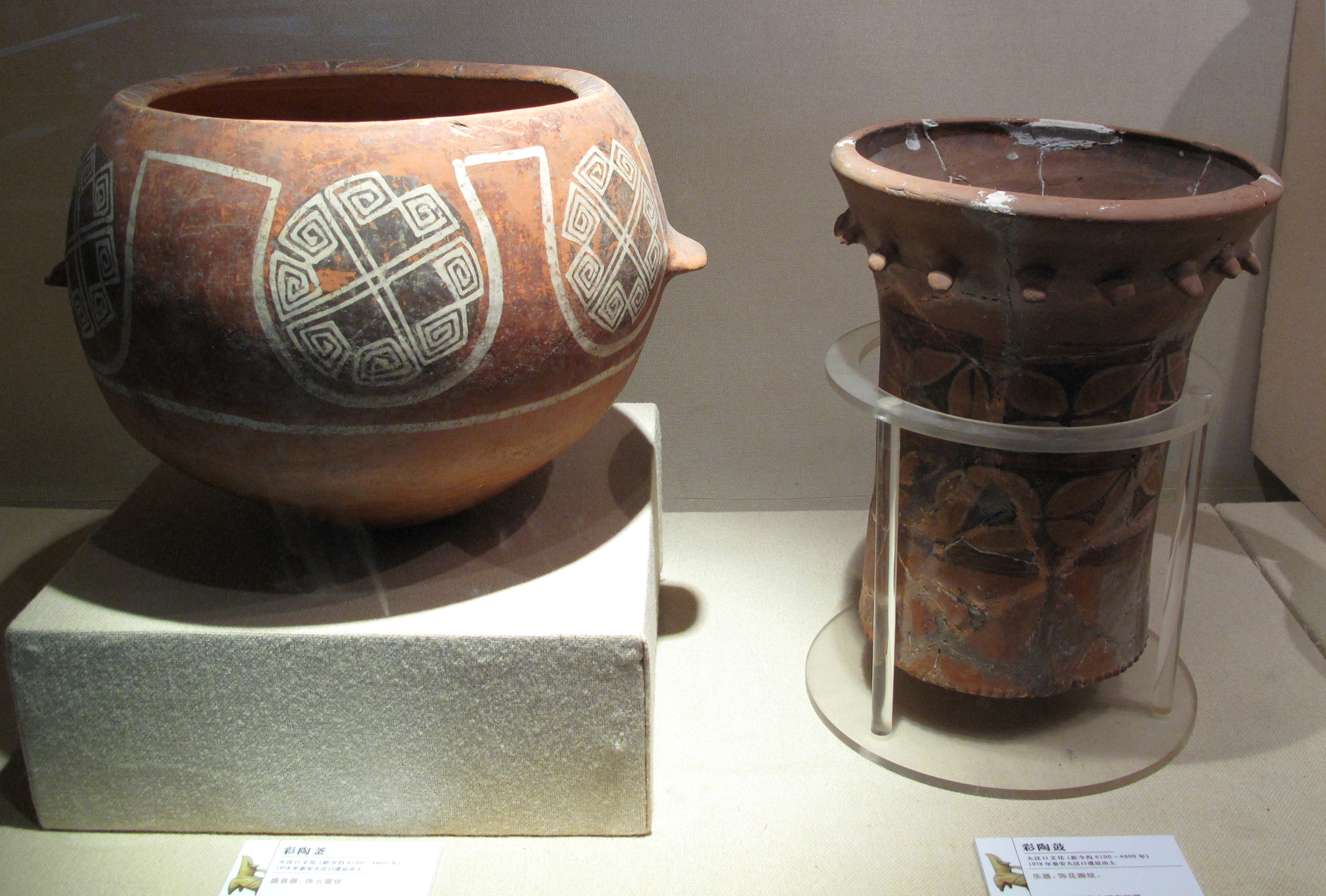
Painted bowl and beaker

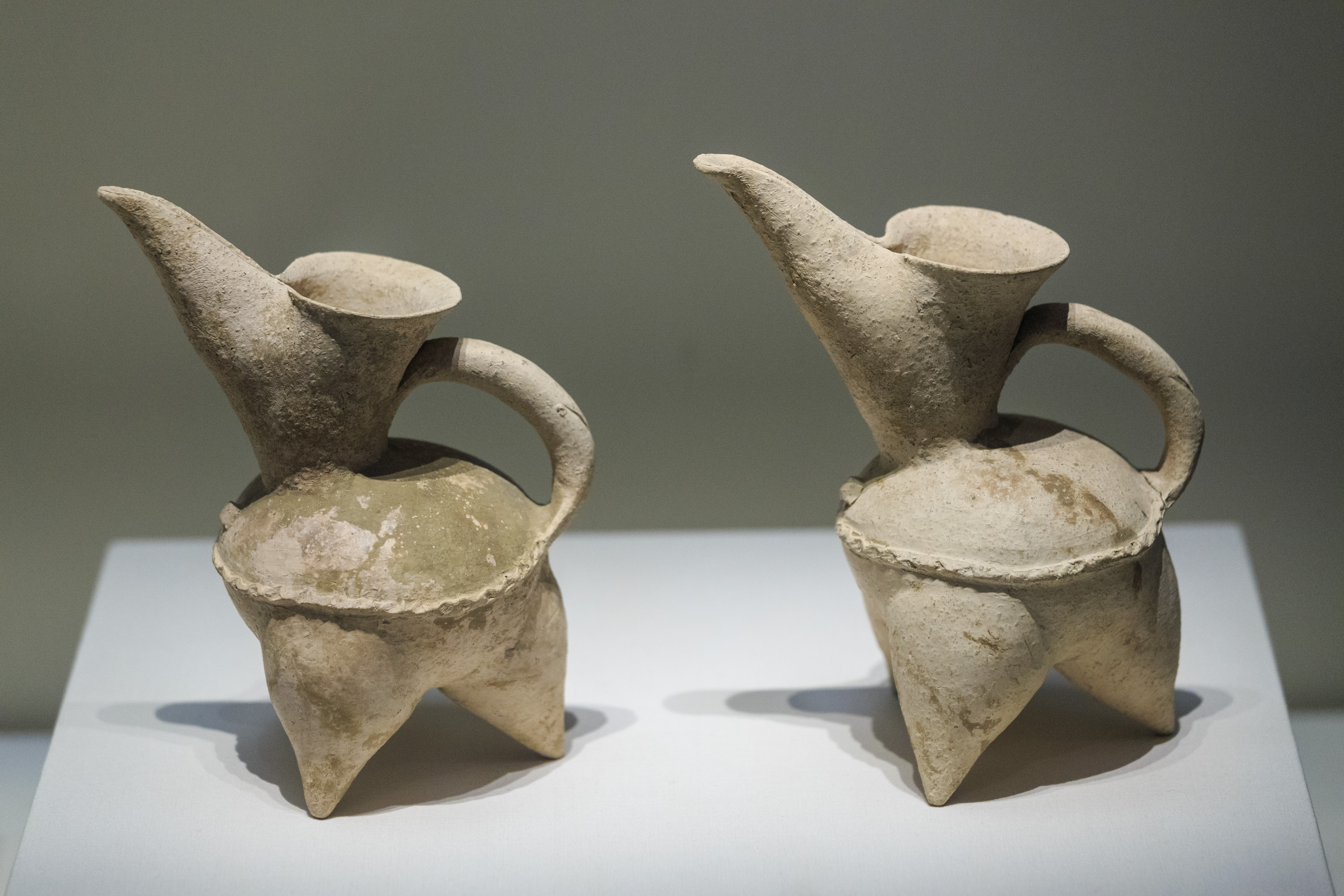
Two white ceramic pitchers (guī 鬹)

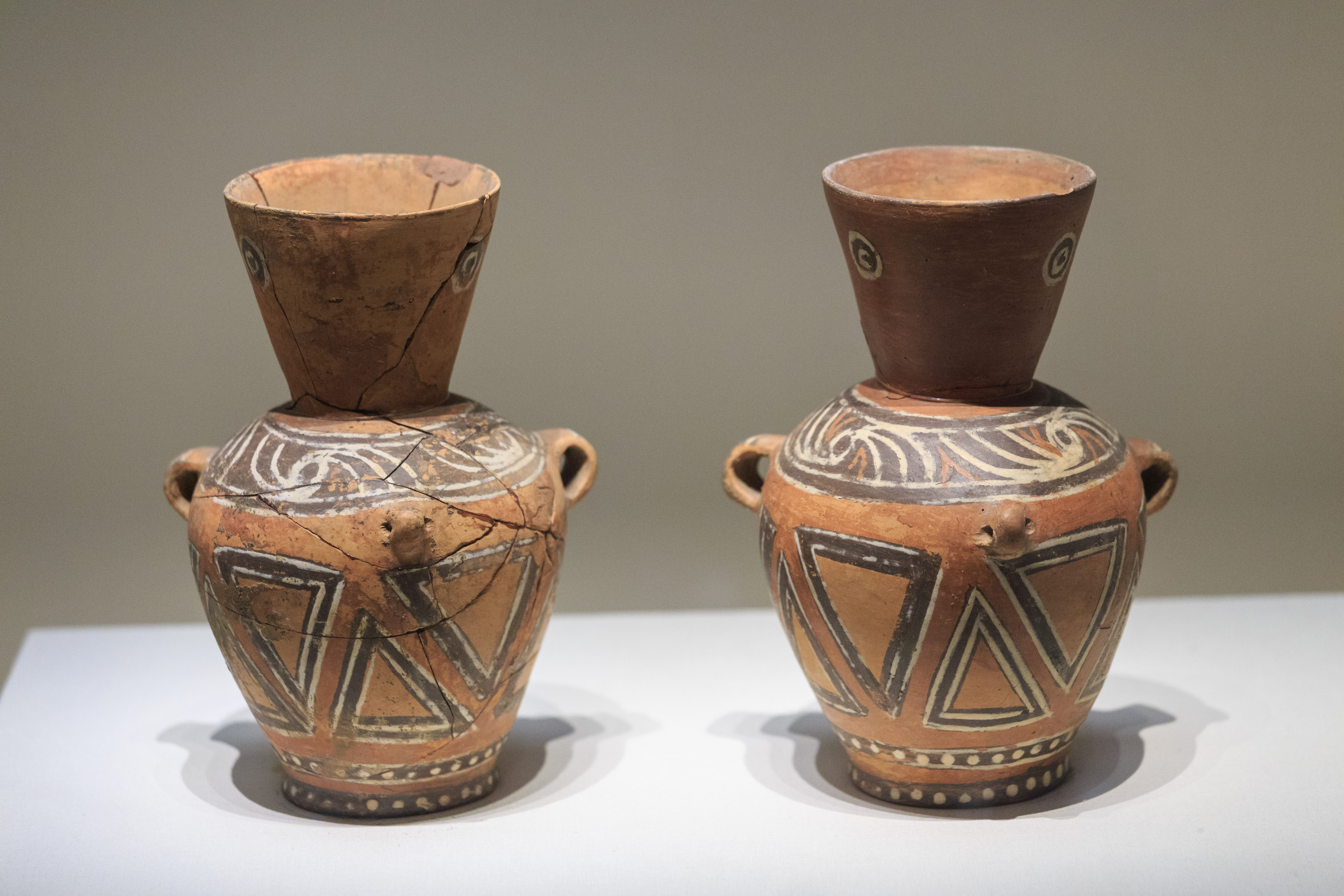
Two painted red jars

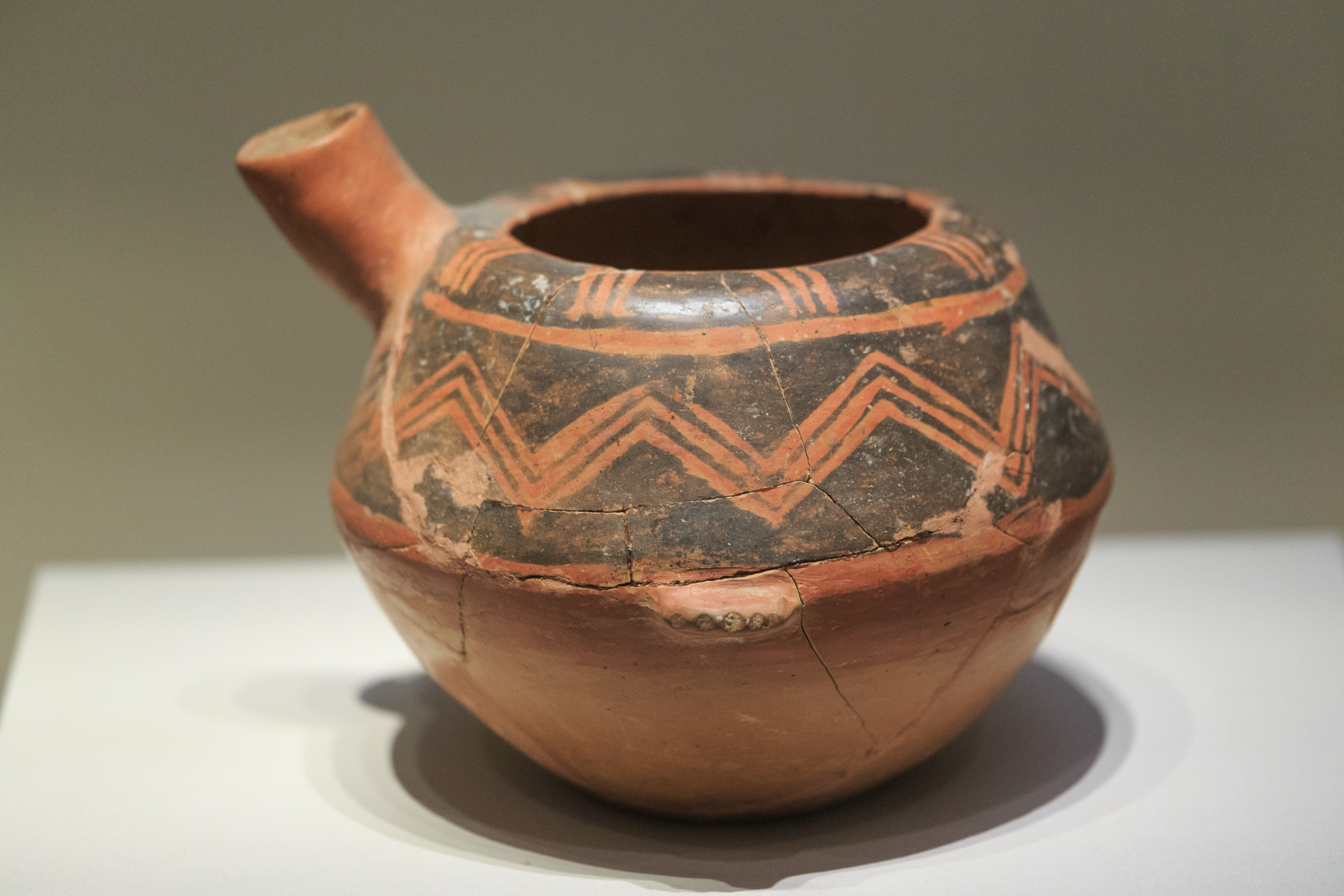

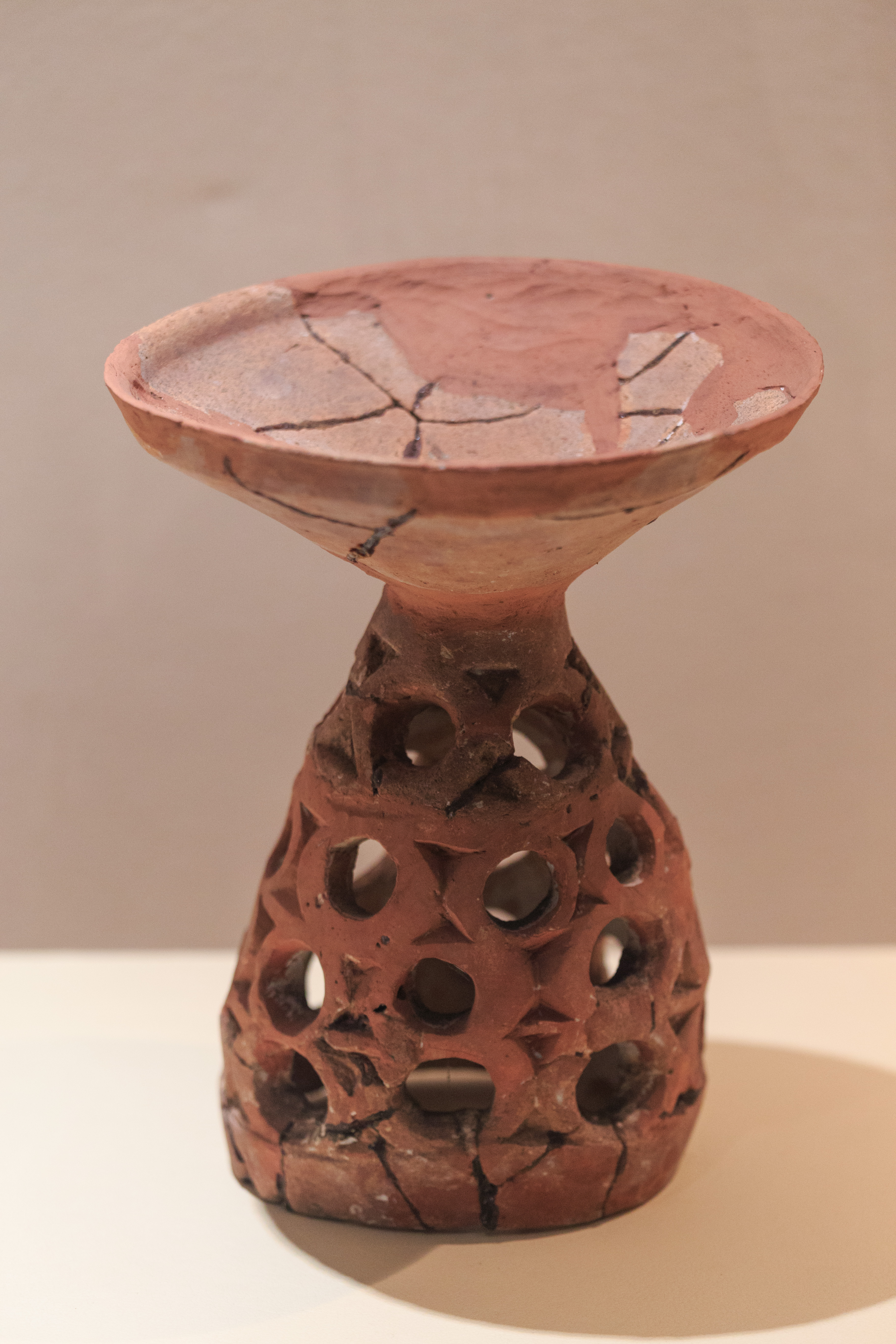

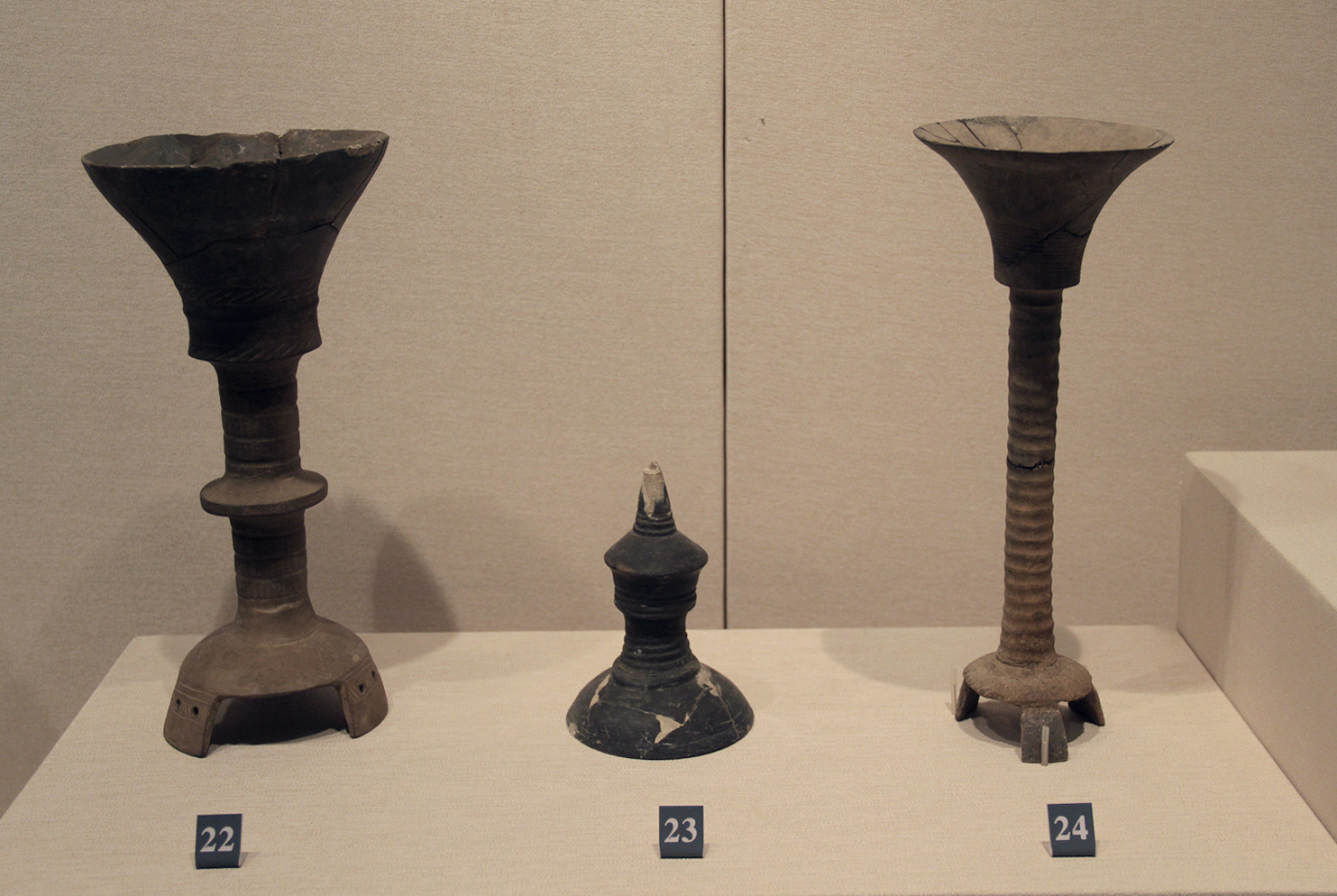
Black stemmed goblets

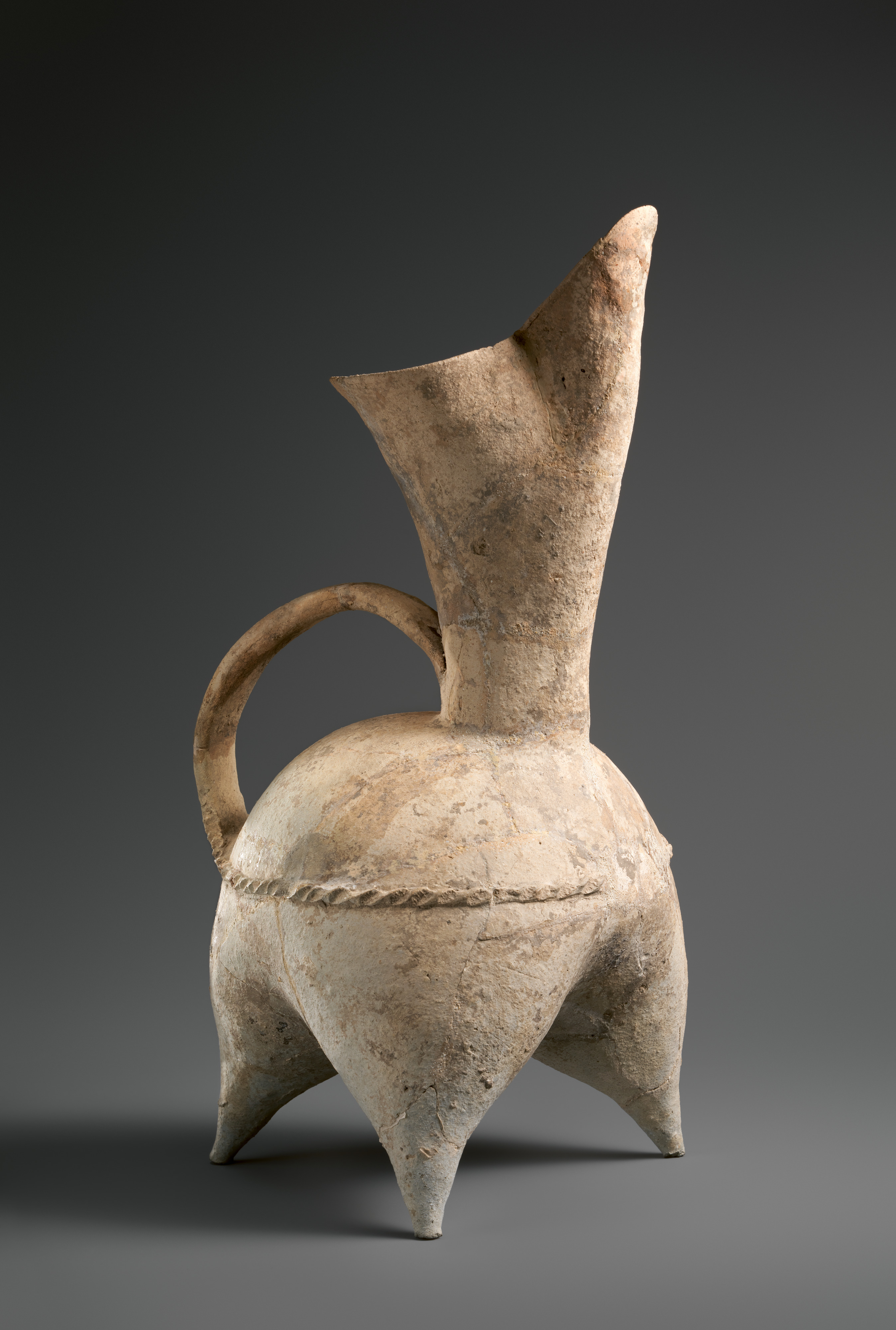
Tripod pitcher

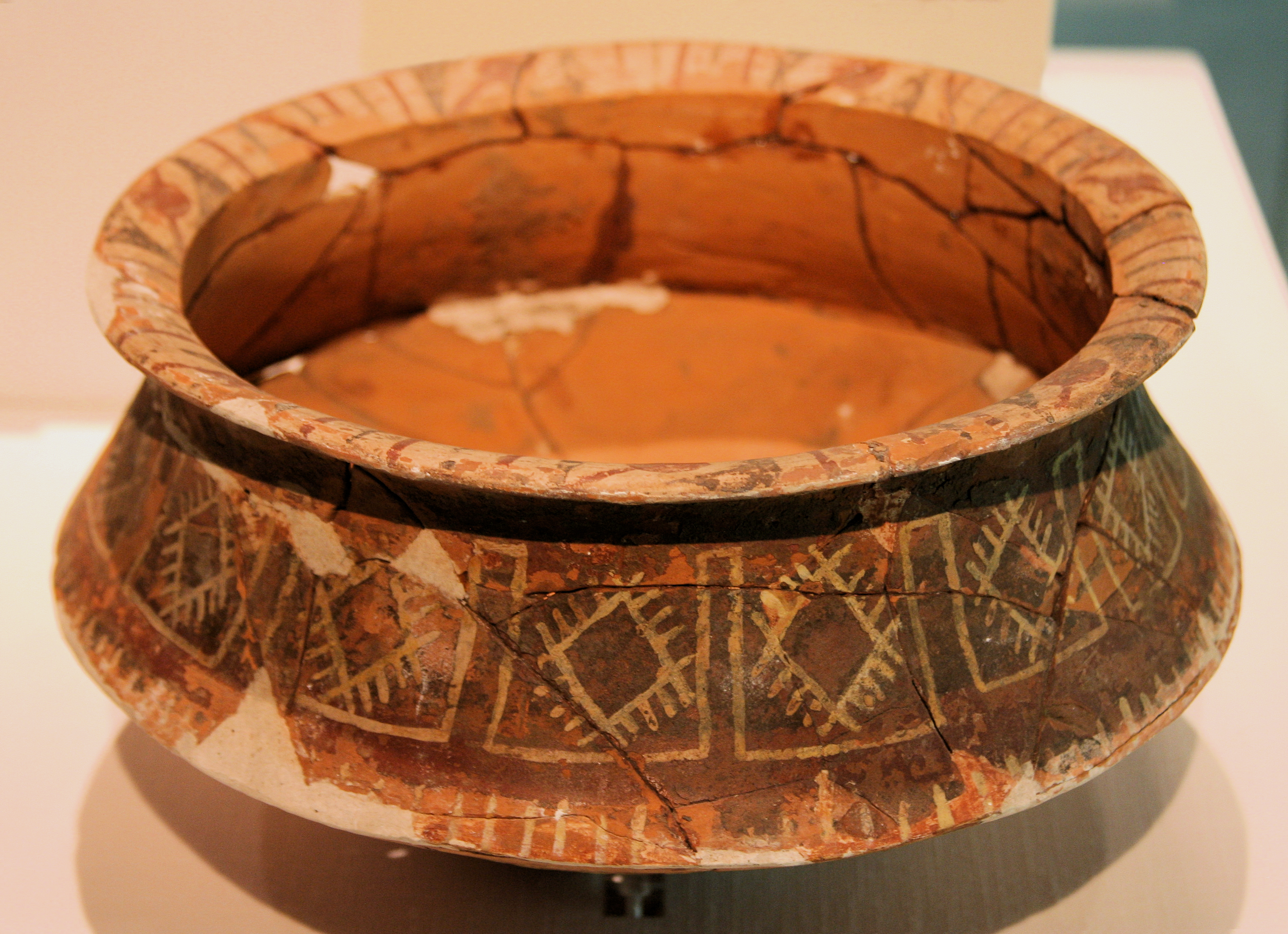
Painted Pottery Pot Early Dawenkou Culture (c. 4,400—3,600 BCE) Excavated from Wangyin Site, Yanzhou, Shandong. Capital Museum, Beijing.

== See also ==
- List of Neolithic cultures of China
- Longshan culture
- Richard J. Pearson – this Canadian archaeologist has published extensively on Dawenkou burials and social status (see Selected Bibliography of Pearson).
- Three Sovereigns and Five Emperors
- Yangshao culture
