= Kwang-chih Chang =

Taiwanese anthropologist, archaeologist, and sinologist (1931–2001)

- 張光直
- Born: April 15, 1931; Beijing, Republic of China
- Died: January 3, 2001 (aged 69); Boston, Massachusetts, U.S.
- Occupations: Archaeologist; sinologist; professor; translator
- Known for: Pioneering Taiwanese archaeology, multi-disciplinary anthropological archaeology
- Awards: AAS Award for Distinguished Contributions to Asian Studies (1996)

Academic background
- Education: National Taiwan University (BA); Harvard University (PhD)
- Thesis: Prehistoric Settlements in China: A Study in Archaeological Method and Theory (1960)
- Academic advisor: Li Ji

Academic work
- Discipline: Archaeology, anthropology, sinology, Asian studies
- Sub-discipline: Prehistory of Taiwan, Chinese prehistory, East Asian prehistory, archaeological theory, settlement archaeology
- Institutions: Yale University; Harvard University; National Academy of Sciences; Academia Sinica
- Notable students: Robin D. S. Yates, Lothar von Falkenhausen, Wu Hung, Bruce Trigger, Richard J. Pearson, Choi Mong-lyong, Li Liu
- Main interests: East Asia prehistory, multi-disciplinary archaeology, shamanism, archaeological theory, Bronze Age society

Kwang-chih Chang (Chinese: 張光直; April 15, 1931 – January 3, 2001), commonly known as K. C. Chang, was a Taiwanese anthropologist, archaeologist, and sinologist who was the John E. Hudson Professor of Archaeology at Harvard University. He also served as the vice-president of Academia Sinica and as a curator at the Peabody Museum of Archaeology and Ethnology. He helped to bring modern, western methods of archaeology to the study of ancient Chinese history. He also introduced new discoveries in Chinese archaeology to western audiences by translating works from Chinese to English. He pioneered the study of Taiwanese archaeology, encouraged multi-disciplinal anthropological archaeological research, and urged archaeologists to conceive of East Asian prehistory (China, Korea, and Japan) as a pluralistic whole.

== Early life ==
Chang was born in Beijing on April 15, 1931, the second son in a family of four children. His paternal grandfather was a farmer in Taiwan. His father, Chang Wo-chün, moved in 1921 to complete his education in Beijing, where he met and married Chang's mother. Wo-chun later became a professor of Japanese literature and language at Peking University and developed a reputation as a leading literary figure.

In 1946, Chang moved with his family to Taiwan. His close association with his older brother, who had chosen to remain in mainland China, led to a year-long imprisonment during the White Terror when he was 17 years old. He enrolled in National Taiwan University in 1950 to study archaeology and anthropology. After graduating in 1954, he moved to the United States to complete doctoral studies and earned his Ph.D. from Harvard University in 1960. His doctoral dissertation was titled Prehistoric Settlements in China: A Study in Archaeological Method and Theory.

== Career ==
Chang began his teaching career in the Anthropology Department at Yale University and later became the chair of the department. In 1977, he returned to Harvard to chair its Department of Anthropology. He became a member of the United States National Academy of Sciences in 1979 and the John E. Hudson Professor of Archaeology at Harvard in 1984. He was a Vice-President of Taiwan's Academia Sinica from 1994 to 1996. He trained many students over the years including distinguished archaeologists such as Bruce Trigger, Richard J. Pearson, and Choi Mong-lyong.

Chang's main research interests included Chinese prehistory, archaeological theory, settlement archaeology, shamanism, Bronze Age society, and the development of and interaction between regional archaeological cultures in China.

He died on January 3, 2001, in Boston, from complications due to Parkinson's disease. Most of his books of personal research are preserved in the International Center for East Asian Archaeology and Cultural History, Boston University.

== Selected works ==
In a statistical overview derived from writings by and about Chang, OCLC/WorldCat encompasses more than 100 works in more than 200 publications in 9 languages and more than 9000 library holdings.

- The Archaeology of Ancient China (1963), 2nd ed. (1968), 3rd ed. (1977), 4th ed. (1986)
- Kwang-chih Chang (1966). Robert J. Braidwood and Gordon R. Willey (ed.). China. Courses Toward Urban Life. Chicago: Aldine Publishing Company – via Internet Archive.
- Rethinking Archaeology (1967)
- Settlement Archaeology (1968)
- Fengpitou, Tapenkeng, and the Prehistory of Taiwan (1969)
- Chang Kwang-chih (1972). Major Aspects of Ch'u Archaeology. Early Chinese Art and its Possible Influence in the Pacific Basin. New York, Intercultural Arts Press – via Internet Archive.
- Early Chinese Civilization: Anthropological Perspectives (1976)
- Food in Chinese Culture: Anthropological and Historical Perspectives (1977)
- Shang Civilization (1980)
- The Cambridge History of Ancient China: From the Origins of Civilization to 221 BC (1999)
- "The Chinese Bronze Age: A Modern Synthesis", in Fong, Wen, ed. (1980). The great bronze age of China: an exhibition from the People's Republic of China. New York: The Metropolitan Museum of Art. pp. 35–50. ISBN 0-87099-226-0.
- Art, Myth and Ritual: the Path to Political Authority in Ancient China (1983)
- "The Rise of Kings and the Formation of City-states", in Allan, Sarah, ed. (2002). The Formation of Chinese Civilization: an archaeological perspective. Yale University Press. pp. 125–139. ISBN 978-0-300-09382-7.

== Honors ==
- Association for Asian Studies (AAS), 1996 Award for Distinguished Contributions to Asian Studies
