= Shang Civilization =

Shang dynasty history book

- Shang Civilization, first edition cover
- Author: Kwang-chih Chang
- Subject: Shang dynasty
- Publisher: Yale University Press
- Publication date: 1980
- Media type: Paper (hardback)
- Pages: 417
- ISBN: 0-300-02428-2
- Text: Shang Civilization at Internet Archive

Shang Civilization is a history of the Shang dynasty by Kwang-chih Chang (Chinese: 張光直). It was published by Yale University Press in 1980. It is dedicated to Chang's doctoral advisor, Li Chi, who had died the previous year.

== Synopsis ==
After the front matter, there is a 66-page prolegomena, "Five Doors to Shang". This is followed by part I, "The Shang Society from An-yang", and part II, "Shang History beyond An-yang". There is a brief epilogue, "Shang in the Ancient World", followed by a postscript that notes some additional material that had come to light since the original manuscript was finished in 1978, and after that the standard back matter.

== Reception ==
Shang Civilization was widely reviewed in scholarly journals.
