= Jeong Ji-hae =

Korean archaeologist (fl. 18th century)

Jeong Ji-hae is acknowledged as the first person to conduct an archaeological excavation in Korea (Joseon) in 1748.

Jeong was the father of a governor of Jinju in south-central Joseon. He was interested in history and the identity of his forebears. In 1748 Jeong carried out the excavation of six ancient burials dated to the Goryeo Dynasty (AD 918-1392) (Kim 1986:125). However, he failed to confirm if the personages of the burials were his direct ancestors. Kim Won-yong regards Jeong's research as the first archaeological excavations in Korea.

== See also ==
- Joseon
- Goryeo
- History of Korea
