= Alligator drum =

Type of drum once used in Neolithic China

Percussion instrument
- Classification: Membranophone
- Hornbostel–Sachs classification: 211.2 (Tubular drums)
- Developed: China

The alligator drum (simplified Chinese: 鼍鼓; traditional Chinese: 鼉鼓; pinyin: tuó gǔ) is a type of drum once used in Neolithic China, made from clay and alligator hides.

Alligator drums have been found over a broad area at the Neolithic sites from modern Shandong in the east to Qinghai in the west, dating to a period of 5500–2350 BC. In literary records, drums manifested shamanistic characteristics and were often used in ritual ceremonies. Drums covered with alligator skin for ceremonial use are mentioned in the Shijing.

During the Archaic period, alligators probably lived along the east coast of China, including southern Shandong. The earliest alligator drums, comprising a wooden frame covered with alligator skin, are found in the archaeological sites at Dawenkou, as well as several sites of Longshan.

Typical acoustic characteristics of the alligator drum are as follows: frequency: 4100–2600 Hz, amplitude: 3000–2000 dB, and wavelength: 2300–1900 Hz.
