= Beixin culture =

Archaeological culture in China

- Geographical range: Shandong
- Period: Neolithic China
- Dates: c. 5300 – c. 4100 BC
- Preceded by: Houli culture
- Followed by: Dawenkou culture

Chinese name
- Chinese: 北辛文化
Transcriptions
Standard Mandarin
- Hanyu Pinyin: Běixīn wénhuà

The Beixin culture (5300–4100 BC) was a Neolithic culture in Shandong, China. It was the successor of the Houli culture (6500–5500 BC) and precursor of the Dawenkou culture (4100–2600 BC). The Beixin culture contains the first example of dental ablation in China, a practice that became common in the Dawenkou.

The type site at Beixin was discovered in Tengzhou, Shandong, China. The site was excavated from 1978 to 1979.

== Excavation findings ==
Fifty sites from the culture were discovered, located in central and southern Shandong and northern Jiangsu provinces. These show evidence of millet cultivation and water buffalo, pig, and chicken domestication. The Beixin people fished for carp in the nearby river, hunted deer, and foraged for wild pears, roots, and tubers. They made extensive use of hemp fibers to weave fabric for clothing, to make baskets, and for various forms of thread, twine and rope, including their fishing nets. There is no evidence of hemp cultivation, but it grew wild in great abundance throughout the region. Small quantities of hemp seeds have been recovered, but archaeologists believe these were acquired as a food source rather than for planting.

Houses tended to be semi-subterranean and circular. The Beixin people had separate housing and burial areas in the settlements, which was common for early Neolithic cultures. The houses and burial areas were clustered in small groups, which indicated a family or clan social structure in both life and death. Tools, weapons, and other articles buried with the dead as burial offerings, in the more recent grave sites, indicated the development of a type of early ceremonial burial.

Examination of the remains indicates steady population growth over the history of the Beixin people, as well as a steady increase in lifespan, which suggests improvements in nutrition and health. Chemical analysis of the abundant pottery shards found at the sites indicates that pork and millet were the staples of the Beixin diet, supplemented by venison, chicken, eggs, and a plentiful assortment of fruits and vegetables. This represents a broadly varied and very nutritious diet by Neolithic standards.

Violent death, as revealed by examination of the remains, was relatively uncommon among the Beixin people compared with other Neolithic cultures. Death was almost always attributed to disease or the results of old age. This indicates that the Beixin were a peaceful culture, and not troubled by internal strife or conflicts with neighboring cultures.

== Artifacts ==
Typical artifacts from the Beixin culture include stone axe heads, spearheads and arrowheads from hunting weapons, and stone sickle blades used to harvest grain.

== See also ==
- List of Neolithic cultures of China
- Houli culture
- Dawenkou culture
