= Houli culture =

Prehistoric culture in China

- Geographical range: Shandong
- Period: Neolithic China
- Dates: c. 6500 – c. 5500 BC
- Type site: Houli
- Major sites: Yuezhuang
- Followed by: Beixin culture

Chinese name
- Chinese: 后李文化
Transcriptions
Standard Mandarin
- Hanyu Pinyin: Hòulǐ wénhuà

The Houli culture (6500–5500 BC) was a Neolithic culture in Shandong, China. The culture was followed by the Beixin culture.

== Archaeological findings ==
The people of the culture lived in square, semi-subterranean houses. The most commonly found artefacts at Houli sites are pottery and stone tools. Jade artefacts and bone, antler, and shell tools were also found at Houli sites. While the remains of domesticated dogs and pigs in the early stages of domestication were found at some sites associated with the culture, the people of the Houli culture relied mostly on hunting and fishing. The remains of rice, broomcorn millet, and foxtail millet were discovered at Houli sites.

== Sites ==
The type site at Houli was discovered in the Linzi District of Shandong and was excavated from 1989 to 1990.

Currently, about a dozen sites have been found to be associated with the Houli culture. Five sites from the culture have been excavated so far. Aside from the type site at Houli, excavations have also taken place at Xihe, Xiaojingshan, Qianbuxia, and Yuezhang.

=== Yuezhang ===
Archaeologists excavated domesticated millet from the Yuezhuang site. The millet found at Yuezhuang was predominantly broomcorn millet and dated to around 8000 BP, making it one of the earliest sites in China to show evidence of millet cultivation. Rice grains were also found at the site. (Note: unable to confirm as domesticated rice per Wang 2013) The carbonized rice was dated using AMS radiocarbon dating to 8010-7700 BP.

Footed stone grinding slabs, in a style identical to those found at the Peiligang culture, were discovered at Yuezhang. This similarity is most likely due to technological transfer.

No evidence for domesticated animals were found at Yuezhang, as the animal bones found at the site all came from wild animals.

== Gallery ==
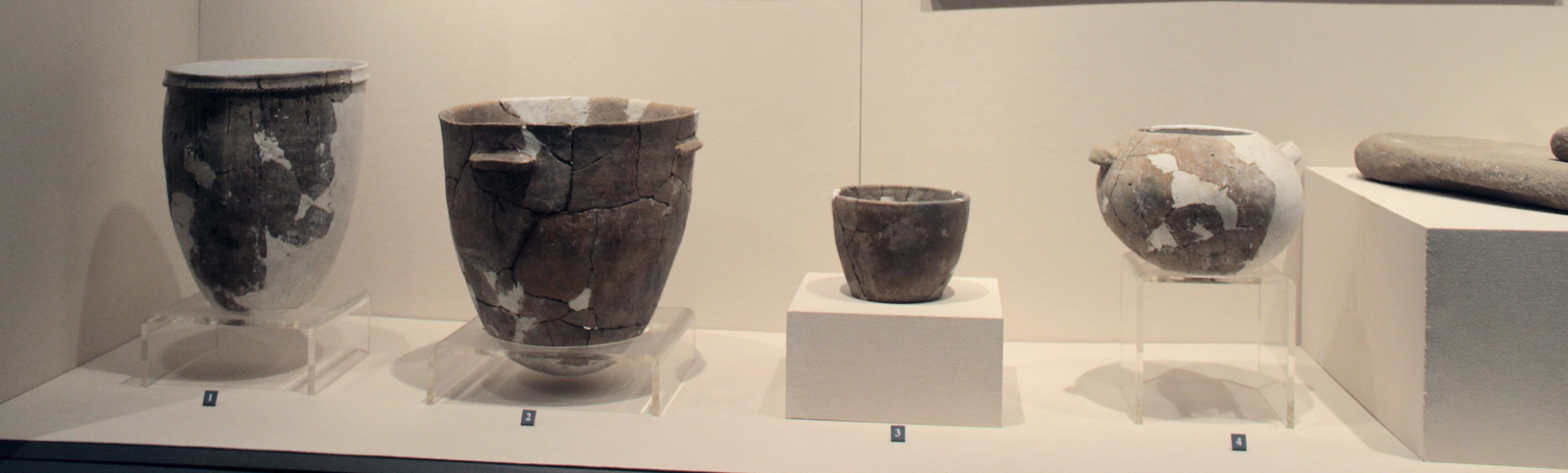
Houli Culture pottery. Shandong Provincial Museum

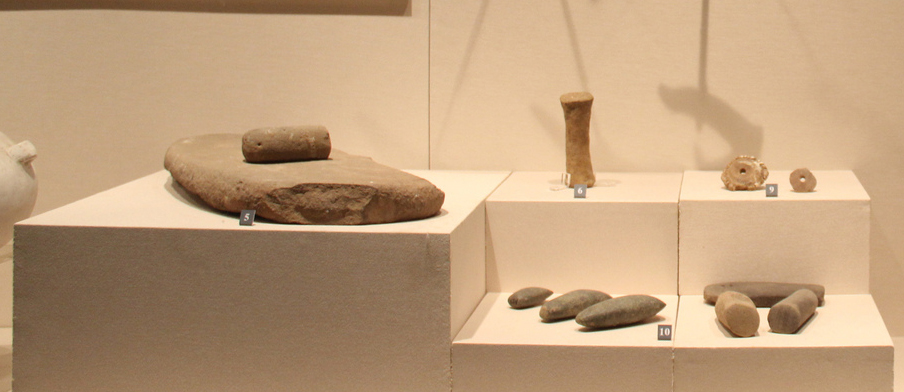
Houli culture grinding slab and handstone, stone axes. Jinan Museum.

== See also ==
- List of Neolithic cultures of China
- Peiligang culture

== Bibliography ==
- Allan, Sarah (ed), The Formation of Chinese Civilization: An Archaeological Perspective, ISBN 0-300-09382-9
- Liu, Li (2004). The Chinese Neolithic: Trajectories to Early States. Cambridge University Press. ISBN 0-521-81184-8.
- Liu, Li; Chen, Xingcan (2012). The Archaeology of China: From the Late Paleolithic to the Early Bronze Age. Cambridge University Press. ISBN 978-0-521-64310-8.
- Wang, Fen (2013). "Chapter 19: The Houli and Beixin Cultures". In Underhill, Anne P. (ed.). A Companion to Chinese Archaeology. John Wiley & Sons. pp. 389–410. ISBN 978-1-4443-3529-3.
