= Kim Won-yong =

South Korean archaeologist (1922–1993)

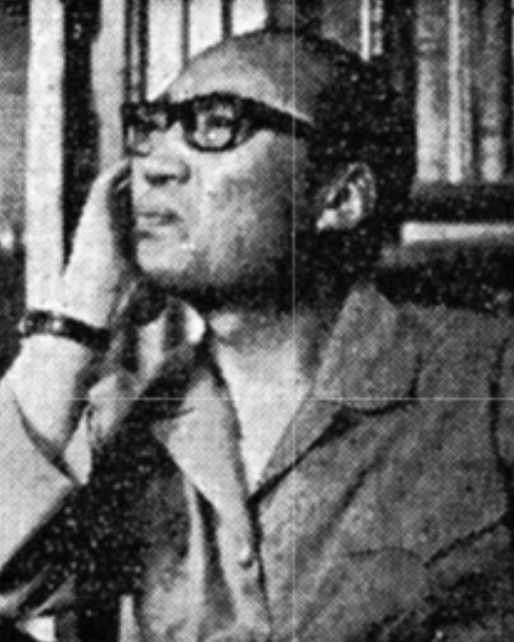

Korean name
- Hangul: 김원용
- Hanja: 金元龍
- RR: Gim Wonyong
- MR: Kim Wŏnyong

Kim Won-yong (1922–1993) was a South Korean archaeologist and art historian. Noted in the discipline of Korean archaeology and ancient art history (Yoon 2006), he was one of the first people recognized as an archaeologist in Korea to receive a Doctor of Philosophy degree.

Kim graduated from New York University in 1959 and was known in the latter part of his career as the "Doyen of Korean Archaeology" (Nelson 1995). He, along with others such as Kim Jeong-hak (Korea University), Kim Jae-won (Seoul National University), Kim Jung-bae (Korea University), Kim Jong-gi, Son Bo-gi (Yonsei University), and Lee Eun-chang are pioneers of modern Korean academia who were influenced not only by the discipline of archaeology but history, art history, architecture, and Korean philosophy.

== Education and career ==
Kim began his studies at Keijō Imperial University, the precursor of Seoul National University (SNU), during the Japanese colonization of Korea (1905 – 1945), and graduated from there with a bachelor's degree in 1945. He wrote his PhD thesis on Silla ceramics, and after receiving his New York University (NYU) PhD, Kim returned to South Korea. He started as a professor at SNU in 1961 and began a long and influential career there, with the exception of 1970–1971 when he served as the director of the National Museum of Korea. Kim was a founding member of the Department of Archaeology and Ancient Art History at SNU. In South Korea, the academic juxtaposition of archaeology and ancient art history is partly a reflection of the status of such studies in traditional Korean and Northeast Asian culture. However, the mixing of the two is also a reflection of the combination of education that Kim Won-yong received at Keijō Imperial University and NYU. The Department of Ancient Art History and Archaeology at SNU became the main model for the establishment of similar departments at national universities across South Korea.

== Contributions to archaeology ==
It is difficult to overstate the importance of Kim's contributions in Korean archaeology. Kim Won-yong did research on all aspects and all periods of Korean prehistory and early history, and can be considered as the 'Father of Korean Archaeology'. However, Kim will be remembered for laying the foundation of academic archaeology, symbolized by the publication in 1973 of his seminal work, Hanguk Gogohak Gaeseol [Introduction to Korean Archaeology]. This influential book was reprinted 20 times between 1973 and 1996 and remains a must on the reading list of all students of Korean prehistory and early history. Kim published hundreds of articles and excavation reports over his career in Korean, English, and Japanese. He also trained many generations of the leading archaeologists in Korea.

Kim Won-yong realized the importance of Korean ancient and prehistoric cultural heritage, and served as a Senior Committee member of the National Cultural Heritage Committee of Korea from 1958 to 1992. He was a great proponent of academic exchange with western archaeology, and as such did research with archaeologists such as Richard J. Pearson. Kim was also a vocal critic of the New Archaeology (Processualism) from its inception in the early 1960s, publishing several key letters to the editor in American Antiquity that were critical of the 'new' theoretical movement and defended the 'old guard' of functional and cultural historical archaeology.

== Sambul ==
Kim Won-yong was also an artist. He painted traditional monochromatic ink pieces, multi-coloured ink paintings, and whimsical self-portraits. Kim took the nom-de-plume "Sambul" (Hanja: 三佛) to sign his paintings. Kim Won-yong died of cancer on November 14, 1993.

== Selected bibliography ==
- Hanguk Gogohak Gaeseol [Introduction to Korean Archaeology]. Iljisa, Seoul, 1973 (1996). ISBN 89-312-0022-6
- (with junior author Pearson, Richard J.) Three Royal Tombs: New Discoveries in Korean Archaeology. Archaeology 30(5):302-312, 1977.
- Art and Archaeology of Ancient Korea. Taekwang Publishing Co., Seoul, 1986.

A detailed bibliography of Kim Won-yong's works is available in Sarah M. Nelson's The Archaeology of Korea, Cambridge University Press, New York, 1993.

== Awards ==
- Ho-Am Prize in the Arts in 1994

== See also ==
- To Yu-ho
- Kim Jung-bae
- Richard J. Pearson
- Choi Mong-lyong
- Sim Bong-geun
