= Sim Bong-geun =

Korean archaeologist

- Hangul: 심봉근
- Hanja: 沈奉謹
- RR: Sim Bonggeun
- MR: Sim Ponggŭn

Sim Bong-geun (Korean: 심봉근; born October 3, 1943 in Goseong) is an archaeologist, university professor and administrator at Dong-A University in Greater Busan, South Korea. Sim was appointed as the 12th president of Dong-A University in 2007.

Sim received his bachelor's and master's degrees at Dong-A University and earned his PhD from Kyushu University in Fukuoka, Japan.

Sim started his archaeological career at the Dong-A University Museum, and was the museum's longtime Director. Upon earning a PhD, Sim joined the faculty of the Department of Archaeology and Art History at Dong-A University. In the 1990s Sim became the department head, and was named the Dean of the Graduate School in 1999. Sim was the vice-president at Dong-A University from 2000–2007.

== See also ==
- Kim Won-yong
- Kim Jung-bae
- Prehistory of Korea

== Selected bibliography ==
- Han-il Jiseokmyo-ui Gwangye [The Relationship between Korean and Japanese Dolmens]. Hanguk Kogo Hakbo [Journal of the Korean Archaeological Society] 10–11, 1981.
- Hanguk Cheongdonggi Sidae Munhwa-ui Ihae [Understanding the Bronze Age of Korea]. Dong-A Daehakgyo Chulpanbu, Greater Busan, 1990.
- Hanguk-eso Bon Ilbon Yayoi Munhwa-ui Jeongae [The Spread of Yayoi Culture as Seen from Korea]. Hakyeon Munhwasa, Seoul, 1999.
