= Choi Mong-lyong =

South Korean archaeologist

- Hangul: 최몽룡
- Hanja: 崔夢龍
- RR: Choe Mongryong
- MR: Ch'oe Mongnyong

Choi Mong-lyong (born 1946) is an archaeologist and professor in the Department of Archaeology and Art History at Seoul National University in Seoul, South Korea. Choi was born in Seoul and received his PhD degree in anthropology in 1984 from Harvard University in the United States. At Harvard, Choi was a student of K.C. Chang.

Choi has conducted archaeological research on the Mumun Pottery Period, the rise of civilization, ancient cities, and states. Although they are truly multi-authored publications, Choi is credited as the author of many archaeological site reports from Jeonnam University and Seoul National University Museum.

Choi Mong-lyong served as assistant dean of the Faculty of Humanities at SNU in the late 1980s and was the director of the Seoul National University Museum from 1995 to 1999. He has been a member of the National Heritage Committee of Korea since 1999. Choi is a past president of the Korean Ancient Historical Society.

== Selected bibliography ==
- Dolmens of Korea, Archaeology. Ethnology & Anthropology of Eurasia 2, 2000.
- Origin and Distribution of Korean Dolmens. Hanguk Sanggosa Hakbo [Journal of the Korean Ancient Historical Society] 39, 1999.
- Trade in Wiman State Formation. In Pacific Northeast Asia in Prehistory, edited by C. Melvin Aikens and Song-nai Rhee, pp. Washington State University, Pullman, 1992.
- (with Rhee Song-nai, senior author). Emergence of Complex Society in Prehistoric Korea. Journal of World Prehistory 6(1):51-95, 1992.
- A Study of Youngsan River Valley Culture. PhD dissertation, Harvard University, Cambridge, 1984.
- Jaemi Innun Gogohak Yeohaeng [Interesting Archaeological Tourism]. Hakyeon Munhwasa, Seoul, 1991.
- Yeongsan-gang Yuyeok-eui Seonsa Yujeok Yumul [Prehistoric Sites and Artifacts Discovered form the Yeongsan-gang River Valley]. Yeoksa Hakbo [Journal of History] 73:67-87, 1973.

== See also ==
- Jeong Ji-hae
- Kim Won-yong
- K.C. Chang
- Mumun Pottery Period
- Prehistory of Korea
- Proto–Three Kingdoms
- Korean Three Kingdoms
