= Richard J. Pearson =

Canadian archaeologist

Richard Joseph Pearson (born May 2, 1938) is a Canadian archaeologist.

He grew up in Toronto and Oakville, Ontario, and graduated with a bachelor's degree at the University of Toronto in 1960. Richard Pearson studied at the University of Hawaii, and Yale University under K.C. Chang, and received his doctorate in anthropology in 1966. Over his career Pearson’s research interests have included the archaeology of Polynesia and East Asia.

Pearson attended the Summer Field School of the University of Western Ontario at Fort Penetanguishene and the Forget Site in Ontario in 1954 and participated in field survey and excavation with the Royal Ontario Museum (Serpent Mound), University of Toronto (Ault Park), National Museum of Canada (New Brunswick) the Bishop Museum (Hawaii and Tahiti) and Yale/National Taiwan University (Taiwan) from 1955 to 1965. His dissertation research concerned the Ryukyu Islands (1962–63). He started his career as a professor at the University of Hawaii, excavating at the Bellows Field Archeological Area and Lapakahi Complex in Hawaii. In the 1970s he continued field work in Okinawa. He returned to Canada in 1971 and spent most of his career as a professor in the Department of Anthropology and Sociology in the University of British Columbia in Vancouver, Canada. Pearson has written, edited, and/or translated a number of important books and journal articles on Japanese, Chinese, and Korean archaeology. Many of these publications depended on the collaboration of his wife, Kazue Miyazaki Pearson. His publications mostly concern East Asian prehistory with a focus on subsistence, trade and exchange, and social and economic organization. Part of his mission has been to make available in English the work of East Asian archaeologists and to show long term historical trends. Areas of research include the Jomon Culture of Japan, the Korean "Bronze Age", Chinese Neolithic cultures, the Ryukyu Islands, Taiwan, and the ancient cities of Osaka and Quanzhou. In 2015 he received a Book Accolade for Ground Breaking Matter from the International Conference of Asian Studies for his book Ancient Ryukyu (2013).

== Selected bibliography ==
- Pearson, Richard J. (1968). "Migrations from Japan to Ecuador: the Japanese Evidence". American Anthropologist. 70 (1): 85–86. doi:10.1525/aa.1968.70.1.02a00090.
- Pearson, Richard J. (1970). "Archaeological Investigations in Eastern Taiwan". Asian Perspectives. XI: 137–156.
- An Early Prehistoric Site at Bellows Beach, Waimanalo, Oahu, Hawaiian Islands (P.V. Kirch and M. Pietrusewsky, junior authors). Archaeology and Physical Anthropology in Oceania. VI:204-234, 1971.
- Pearson, Richard J. (1974). "Pollen Counts in North China". Antiquity. XLVIII (191): 226–228.
- Kim, Won-yong; Pearson, Richard J. (1977). "Three Royal Tombs: New Discoveries in Korean Archaeology". Archaeology. 30 (5): 302–312.
- Pearson, Richard J. (1997). "Palaeoenvironment and Human Settlement in Japan and Korea". Science. 197 (4310): 1239–1246. doi:10.1126/science.197.4310.1239. PMID 17781970. S2CID 23580544. (Japanese version translated by T. Seki, Kodai, 76:1-16)
- (editor and translator, with Kazue Pearson) Kim, Jeong-hak, The Prehistory of Korea. University of Hawaii Press, Honolulu, 237 pp., 1978.
- Pearson, Richard J. (1979). "Lolang and the Rise of Korean States and Chiefdoms". Journal of the Hong Kong Archaeological Society. VIII: 77–90.
- Pearson, Richard J. (1981). "Social Complexity in Chinese Coastal Neolithic Sites". Science. 213 (4512): 1078–1086. Bibcode:1981Sci...213.1078P. doi:10.1126/science.213.4512.1078. PMID 17741083. S2CID 19596985.
- Pearson, Richard J.; Underhill, Anne (1987). "The Chinese Neolithic: Recent Trends". American Anthropologist. 89 (4): 807–822. doi:10.1525/aa.1987.89.4.02a00030.
- (editor with junior editors K. Hutterer and G. Barnes) Windows on the Japanese Past. Ann Arbor, Center for Japanese Studies, 496 pp., 1986.
- (with junior authors J.W. Lee, W.Y. Koh, and A. Underhill) Social Ranking in the Kingdom of Old Silla, Korea: Analysis of Burials. Journal of Anthropological Archaeology 8(1):1-50, 1989.
- Pearson, Richard J. (1990). "Chiefly Exchange Between Kyushu and Okinawa, Japan, in the Yayoi Period". Antiquity. 64 (245): 912–922. doi:10.1017/S0003598X00079023. S2CID 163839421.
- Ancient Japan. Washington and New York, A. Sackler Gallery, Agency for Cultural Affairs, Japan, George Braziller, 324 pp., 1992.
- Pearson, Richard J. (2001). "Archaeological Perspectives on the Rise of the Okinawan State". Journal of Archaeological Research. 9 (3): 243–285. doi:10.1023/A:1016610509890. S2CID 140479048.
- (Li Min and Li Guo jr authors) Quanzhou Archaeology: A Brief Review. International Journal of Historical Archaeology 6:1:23-58, 2002.
- Pearson, Richard J. (2005). "The Social Context of Early Pottery in the Lingnan Region of South China". Antiquity. 79 (306): 819–828. doi:10.1017/S0003598X00114954. S2CID 159864579.
- Jomon Hot Spot: Increasing Sedentism in Southwest Japan in the Incipient Jomon (14, 000 – 9, 250 cal BC) and Earliest Jomon (9, 250 – 5,300 cal BC) World Archaeology 38:2: 239-258, 2006.
- Early Mediaeval Trade on Japan’s Southern Frontier: Grey Stoneware of the East China Sea. International Journal of Historical Archaeology 11:2: 122-151, 2007.
- Debating Jomon Social Complexity. Asian Perspectives 46 (2): 361-388, 2007.
- (editor) Okinawa: The Rise of an Island Kingdom: Archaeological and Cultural Perspectives. BAR Series 1898. Oxford. Archaeopress, 2009.
- Pearson, Richard J. (2009). "Fifth-century rulers of the Kawachi Plain, Osaka, and early state formation in Japan: some recent publications". Antiquity. 83 (320): 523–527. doi:10.1017/S0003598X00098641. S2CID 163023990.
- Ancient Ryukyu: An Archaeological Study of Island Communities. Honolulu University of Hawaii Press.2013
- Darwin and Island Archaeology, In "Darwin and Human Evolution" ed. R. Ray, D. Chattopadhyay, S.Banerjee, pp. 33–44. Kolkata, The Asiatic Society, 2014.
- Pearson, Richard J. (2016). "Japanese Mediaeval Trading Towns: Sakai and Tosaminato". Japanese Journal of Archaeology. 3 (2016): 89–116. (e-journal)
- Ōsaka Archaeology. Oxford. Archaeopress, 2016.
- editor, translator, contributor, with S Kaner, B. Ayers, O Wrenn. The Archaeology of Mediaeval Towns. Oxford, Oxbow Books. 2020.
- (co-author Kazue Pearson), Miyazaki Ichisada to Aoki Mokubei, in INOUE Fuminori (ed) Soboku to Bunmei no Rekishigaku (Historiography of Naive and Civilized), pp. 410–424. Tokyo. Kodansha. 2021
- Taiwan Archaeology: Local Development and Cultural Boundaries in the China Seas. Honolulu. University of Hawaii Press. 2023.
- The archaeology of ancient Japanese gardens. Asian Perspectives Vol. 62 No. 2: 202-244.2023.
- Looking at Japanese Gardens of the Kamakura and Muromachi Periods. unpub ms available at Richard Pearson Researchgate. 2024.
- Mid Coastal China in prehistory and history: an archaeological perspective: Ningbo and its environs.unpub ms available at Richard Pearson Researchgate. 2024.
- Vancouver Gardens.unpub ms available at Richard Pearson Researchgate. 2024.
- Lower Yangzi Archaeology. ms available at Richard Pearson Researchgate UBC 2025
