= Kim Jung-bae =

South Korean archaeologist (born 1940)

Kim Jung-bae (Korean: 김정배; born August 1, 1940) is an ancient historian and archaeologist, university professor emeritus, and former president of Korea University in Seoul, South Korea. Kim currently serves as the Chairman of the Goguryeo Research Society.

Kim received his PhD in Ancient History from Korea University and his research has centred on the rise of states in the Korean Peninsula. He was a professor in the Department of History at Korea University from 1977 to 2005. He served as a committee member of the National Historical Compilation Committee from 1982 to 2003. He became the 14th President of Korea University in 1998 and his term finished in 2002.

Kim has received honorary degrees from Yonsei University and Waseda University.

== Education ==
- February 1964: BA in Korean History from Korea University
- July 1967: MA in Korean History from Korea University
- Jan. – Jul. 1970: Visiting scholar at the University of Hawaii (Department of Anthropology)
- August 1975: PhD in Korean History from Korea University
- May 2000: Honorary PhD in Business Administration from Yonsei University
- November 2001: Honorary PhD in History from the University of Kiev, Ukraine
- 2003: Honorary PhD from Waseda University, Japan

== Career ==
- 1970–1977: Lecturer, assistant professor and associate professor at the Humanities College of Korea University
- 1977–2005: Professor of Korean History at Korea University
- 1980–1981: Visiting scholar at the Yenching Institute of Harvard University
- 1982–1982: Visiting professor at the University of Paris VII, Paris, France
- 1992–1992: Chairman of the Korea Research Foundation Steering Committee
- 1998–2002: President of Korea University (14th president)
- 2004–2006: Inaugural president of the Koguryo Research Foundation
- 2005–: Professor emeritus at Korea University
- 2006–2008: Trustee of the Korea University Foundation
- Apr. 2008–: Director of the Academy of Korean Studies
- Jul. 7, 2009–: Director of the Korea University Foundation

== Selected bibliography ==
- 1976. Hanguk Minjok-ui Giwon [The Origins of the Korean Race]. Korea University, Seoul.
- 1986. Hanguk Godae-ui Gukga Giwon-gwa Hyeongseong [The Origins and Formation of the Ancient State in Korea]. Korea University, Seoul.
- 1987. Formation of Ethnic Nation and Coming of Its Ancient Kingdom States. Korea Journal 27(4):33-39.
- (editor) 1991. Bukhan-ui Uri Godaesa Insik [North Korean View of Korean Ancient History]. Vol. 2, Daeryuk Yeonguso, Seoul.

== See also ==
- History of Korea
- Prehistory of Korea
